

579001–579100 

|-bgcolor=#d6d6d6
| 579001 ||  || — || May 8, 2014 || Haleakala || Pan-STARRS ||  || align=right | 1.7 km || 
|-id=002 bgcolor=#d6d6d6
| 579002 ||  || — || May 7, 2014 || Haleakala || Pan-STARRS ||  || align=right | 1.9 km || 
|-id=003 bgcolor=#d6d6d6
| 579003 ||  || — || March 28, 2014 || Mount Lemmon || Mount Lemmon Survey ||  || align=right | 2.3 km || 
|-id=004 bgcolor=#d6d6d6
| 579004 ||  || — || May 8, 2014 || Haleakala || Pan-STARRS ||  || align=right | 2.4 km || 
|-id=005 bgcolor=#d6d6d6
| 579005 ||  || — || May 2, 2014 || Kitt Peak || Spacewatch ||  || align=right | 2.5 km || 
|-id=006 bgcolor=#d6d6d6
| 579006 ||  || — || May 8, 2014 || Haleakala || Pan-STARRS ||  || align=right | 2.5 km || 
|-id=007 bgcolor=#d6d6d6
| 579007 ||  || — || May 5, 2014 || Kitt Peak || Spacewatch ||  || align=right | 2.2 km || 
|-id=008 bgcolor=#d6d6d6
| 579008 ||  || — || May 6, 2014 || Haleakala || Pan-STARRS ||  || align=right | 3.3 km || 
|-id=009 bgcolor=#E9E9E9
| 579009 ||  || — || May 6, 2014 || Haleakala || Pan-STARRS ||  || align=right | 1.8 km || 
|-id=010 bgcolor=#fefefe
| 579010 ||  || — || May 3, 2014 || Mount Lemmon || Mount Lemmon Survey ||  || align=right data-sort-value="0.57" | 570 m || 
|-id=011 bgcolor=#E9E9E9
| 579011 ||  || — || February 10, 2014 || Haleakala || Pan-STARRS ||  || align=right | 2.3 km || 
|-id=012 bgcolor=#d6d6d6
| 579012 ||  || — || February 14, 2013 || Haleakala || Pan-STARRS ||  || align=right | 2.7 km || 
|-id=013 bgcolor=#d6d6d6
| 579013 ||  || — || March 6, 2008 || Mount Lemmon || Mount Lemmon Survey ||  || align=right | 3.1 km || 
|-id=014 bgcolor=#d6d6d6
| 579014 ||  || — || May 21, 2014 || Haleakala || Pan-STARRS ||  || align=right | 2.9 km || 
|-id=015 bgcolor=#fefefe
| 579015 ||  || — || March 12, 2004 || Palomar || NEAT ||  || align=right data-sort-value="0.64" | 640 m || 
|-id=016 bgcolor=#d6d6d6
| 579016 ||  || — || April 1, 2003 || Kitt Peak || M. W. Buie, A. B. Jordan ||  || align=right | 2.2 km || 
|-id=017 bgcolor=#d6d6d6
| 579017 ||  || — || November 11, 2012 || Catalina || CSS ||  || align=right | 2.8 km || 
|-id=018 bgcolor=#d6d6d6
| 579018 ||  || — || October 30, 2010 || Mount Lemmon || Mount Lemmon Survey ||  || align=right | 2.1 km || 
|-id=019 bgcolor=#FA8072
| 579019 ||  || — || September 20, 2011 || Les Engarouines || L. Bernasconi ||  || align=right data-sort-value="0.70" | 700 m || 
|-id=020 bgcolor=#d6d6d6
| 579020 ||  || — || May 4, 2014 || Haleakala || Pan-STARRS ||  || align=right | 1.8 km || 
|-id=021 bgcolor=#d6d6d6
| 579021 ||  || — || February 8, 2013 || Haleakala || Pan-STARRS ||  || align=right | 2.3 km || 
|-id=022 bgcolor=#d6d6d6
| 579022 ||  || — || January 9, 2013 || Mount Lemmon || Mount Lemmon Survey ||  || align=right | 3.1 km || 
|-id=023 bgcolor=#d6d6d6
| 579023 ||  || — || October 23, 2011 || Haleakala || Pan-STARRS ||  || align=right | 3.3 km || 
|-id=024 bgcolor=#d6d6d6
| 579024 ||  || — || December 26, 2006 || Kitt Peak || Spacewatch ||  || align=right | 2.4 km || 
|-id=025 bgcolor=#d6d6d6
| 579025 ||  || — || August 23, 2004 || Kitt Peak || Spacewatch ||  || align=right | 3.4 km || 
|-id=026 bgcolor=#d6d6d6
| 579026 ||  || — || November 25, 2011 || Haleakala || Pan-STARRS ||  || align=right | 2.2 km || 
|-id=027 bgcolor=#d6d6d6
| 579027 ||  || — || April 5, 2014 || Haleakala || Pan-STARRS ||  || align=right | 2.8 km || 
|-id=028 bgcolor=#d6d6d6
| 579028 ||  || — || April 19, 2009 || Kitt Peak || Spacewatch ||  || align=right | 3.1 km || 
|-id=029 bgcolor=#d6d6d6
| 579029 ||  || — || May 20, 2014 || Haleakala || Pan-STARRS ||  || align=right | 2.2 km || 
|-id=030 bgcolor=#d6d6d6
| 579030 ||  || — || May 7, 2014 || Haleakala || Pan-STARRS ||  || align=right | 2.6 km || 
|-id=031 bgcolor=#d6d6d6
| 579031 ||  || — || January 18, 2013 || Haleakala || Pan-STARRS ||  || align=right | 3.2 km || 
|-id=032 bgcolor=#d6d6d6
| 579032 ||  || — || April 23, 2014 || Catalina || CSS || Tj (2.99) || align=right | 3.1 km || 
|-id=033 bgcolor=#d6d6d6
| 579033 ||  || — || April 10, 2014 || Haleakala || Pan-STARRS || Tj (2.99) || align=right | 3.2 km || 
|-id=034 bgcolor=#fefefe
| 579034 ||  || — || May 26, 2014 || Mount Lemmon || Mount Lemmon Survey || H || align=right data-sort-value="0.62" | 620 m || 
|-id=035 bgcolor=#d6d6d6
| 579035 ||  || — || March 12, 2014 || Mount Lemmon || Mount Lemmon Survey ||  || align=right | 2.4 km || 
|-id=036 bgcolor=#d6d6d6
| 579036 ||  || — || October 28, 2010 || Mount Lemmon || Mount Lemmon Survey ||  || align=right | 2.5 km || 
|-id=037 bgcolor=#d6d6d6
| 579037 ||  || — || September 15, 2010 || Mount Lemmon || Mount Lemmon Survey ||  || align=right | 2.4 km || 
|-id=038 bgcolor=#fefefe
| 579038 ||  || — || October 1, 2005 || Mount Lemmon || Mount Lemmon Survey ||  || align=right data-sort-value="0.64" | 640 m || 
|-id=039 bgcolor=#d6d6d6
| 579039 ||  || — || October 19, 2011 || Mount Lemmon || Mount Lemmon Survey ||  || align=right | 2.6 km || 
|-id=040 bgcolor=#d6d6d6
| 579040 ||  || — || February 9, 2013 || Haleakala || Pan-STARRS ||  || align=right | 2.5 km || 
|-id=041 bgcolor=#d6d6d6
| 579041 ||  || — || May 7, 2014 || Haleakala || Pan-STARRS ||  || align=right | 2.1 km || 
|-id=042 bgcolor=#d6d6d6
| 579042 ||  || — || November 24, 2011 || Mount Lemmon || Mount Lemmon Survey ||  || align=right | 3.1 km || 
|-id=043 bgcolor=#fefefe
| 579043 ||  || — || March 17, 2004 || Kitt Peak || Spacewatch ||  || align=right data-sort-value="0.55" | 550 m || 
|-id=044 bgcolor=#fefefe
| 579044 ||  || — || May 21, 2014 || Haleakala || Pan-STARRS ||  || align=right data-sort-value="0.65" | 650 m || 
|-id=045 bgcolor=#d6d6d6
| 579045 ||  || — || October 12, 2004 || Moletai || K. Černis, J. Zdanavičius ||  || align=right | 3.8 km || 
|-id=046 bgcolor=#d6d6d6
| 579046 ||  || — || May 7, 2014 || Haleakala || Pan-STARRS ||  || align=right | 2.0 km || 
|-id=047 bgcolor=#d6d6d6
| 579047 ||  || — || October 23, 2011 || Haleakala || Pan-STARRS ||  || align=right | 2.7 km || 
|-id=048 bgcolor=#d6d6d6
| 579048 ||  || — || April 11, 2008 || Kitt Peak || Spacewatch ||  || align=right | 2.2 km || 
|-id=049 bgcolor=#d6d6d6
| 579049 ||  || — || September 11, 2004 || Kitt Peak || Spacewatch ||  || align=right | 2.1 km || 
|-id=050 bgcolor=#fefefe
| 579050 ||  || — || October 6, 2008 || Mount Lemmon || Mount Lemmon Survey ||  || align=right data-sort-value="0.56" | 560 m || 
|-id=051 bgcolor=#fefefe
| 579051 ||  || — || August 6, 2004 || Palomar || NEAT ||  || align=right data-sort-value="0.86" | 860 m || 
|-id=052 bgcolor=#d6d6d6
| 579052 ||  || — || March 9, 2002 || Palomar || NEAT ||  || align=right | 3.4 km || 
|-id=053 bgcolor=#d6d6d6
| 579053 ||  || — || December 30, 2011 || Mount Lemmon || Mount Lemmon Survey ||  || align=right | 3.5 km || 
|-id=054 bgcolor=#fefefe
| 579054 ||  || — || October 10, 2012 || Mount Lemmon || Mount Lemmon Survey || H || align=right data-sort-value="0.41" | 410 m || 
|-id=055 bgcolor=#d6d6d6
| 579055 ||  || — || December 1, 2006 || Mount Lemmon || Mount Lemmon Survey ||  || align=right | 2.7 km || 
|-id=056 bgcolor=#d6d6d6
| 579056 ||  || — || November 27, 2000 || Apache Point || SDSS Collaboration ||  || align=right | 3.5 km || 
|-id=057 bgcolor=#fefefe
| 579057 ||  || — || May 27, 2014 || Haleakala || Pan-STARRS || H || align=right data-sort-value="0.49" | 490 m || 
|-id=058 bgcolor=#d6d6d6
| 579058 ||  || — || October 7, 2004 || Palomar || NEAT ||  || align=right | 3.2 km || 
|-id=059 bgcolor=#d6d6d6
| 579059 ||  || — || April 14, 2008 || Mount Lemmon || Mount Lemmon Survey ||  || align=right | 2.4 km || 
|-id=060 bgcolor=#d6d6d6
| 579060 ||  || — || May 26, 2014 || Haleakala || Pan-STARRS ||  || align=right | 2.0 km || 
|-id=061 bgcolor=#d6d6d6
| 579061 ||  || — || May 26, 2014 || Haleakala || Pan-STARRS ||  || align=right | 2.1 km || 
|-id=062 bgcolor=#C2E0FF
| 579062 ||  || — || June 4, 2010 || Haleakala || Pan-STARRS || other TNOcritical || align=right | 184 km || 
|-id=063 bgcolor=#d6d6d6
| 579063 ||  || — || June 18, 2015 || Haleakala || Pan-STARRS ||  || align=right | 2.5 km || 
|-id=064 bgcolor=#d6d6d6
| 579064 ||  || — || November 25, 2016 || Mount Lemmon || Mount Lemmon Survey ||  || align=right | 1.9 km || 
|-id=065 bgcolor=#d6d6d6
| 579065 ||  || — || October 28, 2005 || Mount Lemmon || Mount Lemmon Survey ||  || align=right | 2.7 km || 
|-id=066 bgcolor=#E9E9E9
| 579066 ||  || — || May 31, 2014 || Haleakala || Pan-STARRS ||  || align=right | 1.5 km || 
|-id=067 bgcolor=#d6d6d6
| 579067 ||  || — || May 23, 2014 || Haleakala || Pan-STARRS ||  || align=right | 1.9 km || 
|-id=068 bgcolor=#fefefe
| 579068 ||  || — || May 23, 2014 || Haleakala || Pan-STARRS ||  || align=right data-sort-value="0.56" | 560 m || 
|-id=069 bgcolor=#d6d6d6
| 579069 ||  || — || May 26, 2014 || Haleakala || Pan-STARRS ||  || align=right | 2.1 km || 
|-id=070 bgcolor=#fefefe
| 579070 ||  || — || May 8, 2014 || Haleakala || Pan-STARRS || H || align=right data-sort-value="0.37" | 370 m || 
|-id=071 bgcolor=#d6d6d6
| 579071 ||  || — || May 24, 2014 || Haleakala || Pan-STARRS ||  || align=right | 3.1 km || 
|-id=072 bgcolor=#d6d6d6
| 579072 ||  || — || May 4, 2014 || Haleakala || Pan-STARRS ||  || align=right | 2.5 km || 
|-id=073 bgcolor=#fefefe
| 579073 ||  || — || June 5, 2014 || Elena Remote || A. Oreshko ||  || align=right data-sort-value="0.71" | 710 m || 
|-id=074 bgcolor=#fefefe
| 579074 ||  || — || June 4, 2014 || Haleakala || Pan-STARRS || H || align=right data-sort-value="0.59" | 590 m || 
|-id=075 bgcolor=#d6d6d6
| 579075 ||  || — || January 20, 2012 || Kitt Peak || Spacewatch ||  || align=right | 3.2 km || 
|-id=076 bgcolor=#fefefe
| 579076 ||  || — || May 12, 2014 || Mount Lemmon || Mount Lemmon Survey || H || align=right data-sort-value="0.59" | 590 m || 
|-id=077 bgcolor=#C2E0FF
| 579077 ||  || — || June 3, 2014 || Haleakala || Pan-STARRS || other TNO || align=right | 245 km || 
|-id=078 bgcolor=#d6d6d6
| 579078 ||  || — || June 4, 2014 || Haleakala || Pan-STARRS ||  || align=right | 2.5 km || 
|-id=079 bgcolor=#d6d6d6
| 579079 ||  || — || June 2, 2014 || Haleakala || Pan-STARRS ||  || align=right | 3.2 km || 
|-id=080 bgcolor=#d6d6d6
| 579080 ||  || — || June 5, 2014 || Haleakala || Pan-STARRS ||  || align=right | 2.5 km || 
|-id=081 bgcolor=#d6d6d6
| 579081 ||  || — || June 2, 2014 || Haleakala || Pan-STARRS ||  || align=right | 2.9 km || 
|-id=082 bgcolor=#d6d6d6
| 579082 ||  || — || June 4, 2014 || Haleakala || Pan-STARRS ||  || align=right | 2.5 km || 
|-id=083 bgcolor=#d6d6d6
| 579083 ||  || — || June 5, 2014 || Haleakala || Pan-STARRS ||  || align=right | 2.2 km || 
|-id=084 bgcolor=#d6d6d6
| 579084 ||  || — || May 7, 2014 || Haleakala || Pan-STARRS ||  || align=right | 2.6 km || 
|-id=085 bgcolor=#fefefe
| 579085 ||  || — || January 13, 2002 || Kitt Peak || Spacewatch ||  || align=right data-sort-value="0.94" | 940 m || 
|-id=086 bgcolor=#d6d6d6
| 579086 ||  || — || July 8, 2003 || Palomar || NEAT || LIX || align=right | 3.7 km || 
|-id=087 bgcolor=#d6d6d6
| 579087 ||  || — || June 2, 2014 || Haleakala || Pan-STARRS ||  || align=right | 2.7 km || 
|-id=088 bgcolor=#d6d6d6
| 579088 ||  || — || June 2, 2014 || Haleakala || Pan-STARRS ||  || align=right | 3.0 km || 
|-id=089 bgcolor=#E9E9E9
| 579089 ||  || — || June 29, 2005 || Kitt Peak || Spacewatch ||  || align=right | 1.8 km || 
|-id=090 bgcolor=#d6d6d6
| 579090 ||  || — || May 28, 2014 || Haleakala || Pan-STARRS ||  || align=right | 2.6 km || 
|-id=091 bgcolor=#d6d6d6
| 579091 ||  || — || May 6, 2014 || Haleakala || Pan-STARRS ||  || align=right | 2.3 km || 
|-id=092 bgcolor=#FA8072
| 579092 ||  || — || December 18, 2007 || Mount Lemmon || Mount Lemmon Survey || H || align=right data-sort-value="0.54" | 540 m || 
|-id=093 bgcolor=#d6d6d6
| 579093 ||  || — || June 23, 2014 || Mount Lemmon || Mount Lemmon Survey ||  || align=right | 2.6 km || 
|-id=094 bgcolor=#fefefe
| 579094 ||  || — || April 9, 2010 || Mount Lemmon || Mount Lemmon Survey ||  || align=right data-sort-value="0.75" | 750 m || 
|-id=095 bgcolor=#d6d6d6
| 579095 ||  || — || May 7, 2014 || Haleakala || Pan-STARRS || 7:4 || align=right | 2.8 km || 
|-id=096 bgcolor=#fefefe
| 579096 ||  || — || May 24, 2000 || Kitt Peak || Spacewatch ||  || align=right data-sort-value="0.56" | 560 m || 
|-id=097 bgcolor=#d6d6d6
| 579097 ||  || — || February 26, 2014 || Catalina || CSS || Tj (2.98) || align=right | 3.3 km || 
|-id=098 bgcolor=#C2FFFF
| 579098 ||  || — || April 4, 2014 || Mount Lemmon || Mount Lemmon Survey || L4 || align=right | 8.5 km || 
|-id=099 bgcolor=#E9E9E9
| 579099 ||  || — || November 13, 2007 || Mount Lemmon || Mount Lemmon Survey ||  || align=right | 2.1 km || 
|-id=100 bgcolor=#d6d6d6
| 579100 ||  || — || June 26, 2014 || Haleakala || Pan-STARRS ||  || align=right | 1.9 km || 
|}

579101–579200 

|-bgcolor=#fefefe
| 579101 ||  || — || October 14, 2001 || Socorro || LINEAR ||  || align=right data-sort-value="0.87" | 870 m || 
|-id=102 bgcolor=#d6d6d6
| 579102 ||  || — || June 29, 2014 || Mount Lemmon || Mount Lemmon Survey ||  || align=right | 2.0 km || 
|-id=103 bgcolor=#d6d6d6
| 579103 ||  || — || February 3, 2013 || Haleakala || Pan-STARRS ||  || align=right | 2.3 km || 
|-id=104 bgcolor=#d6d6d6
| 579104 ||  || — || September 25, 2009 || Kitt Peak || Spacewatch ||  || align=right | 2.3 km || 
|-id=105 bgcolor=#d6d6d6
| 579105 ||  || — || May 7, 2014 || Haleakala || Pan-STARRS ||  || align=right | 2.1 km || 
|-id=106 bgcolor=#d6d6d6
| 579106 ||  || — || January 19, 2012 || Haleakala || Pan-STARRS ||  || align=right | 2.6 km || 
|-id=107 bgcolor=#fefefe
| 579107 ||  || — || June 3, 2014 || Haleakala || Pan-STARRS ||  || align=right data-sort-value="0.69" | 690 m || 
|-id=108 bgcolor=#d6d6d6
| 579108 ||  || — || April 6, 2008 || Kitt Peak || Spacewatch ||  || align=right | 2.7 km || 
|-id=109 bgcolor=#E9E9E9
| 579109 ||  || — || October 23, 2011 || Haleakala || Pan-STARRS ||  || align=right | 2.2 km || 
|-id=110 bgcolor=#E9E9E9
| 579110 ||  || — || June 24, 2014 || Haleakala || Pan-STARRS ||  || align=right | 2.2 km || 
|-id=111 bgcolor=#d6d6d6
| 579111 ||  || — || June 30, 2014 || Haleakala || Pan-STARRS ||  || align=right | 2.8 km || 
|-id=112 bgcolor=#fefefe
| 579112 ||  || — || June 29, 2014 || Haleakala || Pan-STARRS ||  || align=right data-sort-value="0.67" | 670 m || 
|-id=113 bgcolor=#d6d6d6
| 579113 ||  || — || June 22, 2014 || Haleakala || Pan-STARRS ||  || align=right | 2.4 km || 
|-id=114 bgcolor=#E9E9E9
| 579114 ||  || — || June 28, 2014 || Haleakala || Pan-STARRS ||  || align=right | 2.3 km || 
|-id=115 bgcolor=#fefefe
| 579115 ||  || — || June 23, 2014 || Kitt Peak || Spacewatch ||  || align=right data-sort-value="0.85" | 850 m || 
|-id=116 bgcolor=#fefefe
| 579116 ||  || — || October 8, 2015 || Haleakala || Pan-STARRS ||  || align=right data-sort-value="0.54" | 540 m || 
|-id=117 bgcolor=#d6d6d6
| 579117 ||  || — || June 22, 2014 || Haleakala || Pan-STARRS ||  || align=right | 2.2 km || 
|-id=118 bgcolor=#fefefe
| 579118 ||  || — || June 18, 2014 || Haleakala || Pan-STARRS || H || align=right data-sort-value="0.52" | 520 m || 
|-id=119 bgcolor=#fefefe
| 579119 ||  || — || June 25, 2014 || Mount Lemmon || Mount Lemmon Survey ||  || align=right data-sort-value="0.75" | 750 m || 
|-id=120 bgcolor=#fefefe
| 579120 ||  || — || June 20, 2014 || Haleakala || Pan-STARRS ||  || align=right data-sort-value="0.66" | 660 m || 
|-id=121 bgcolor=#fefefe
| 579121 ||  || — || June 30, 2014 || Haleakala || Pan-STARRS ||  || align=right data-sort-value="0.72" | 720 m || 
|-id=122 bgcolor=#E9E9E9
| 579122 ||  || — || June 27, 2014 || Haleakala || Pan-STARRS ||  || align=right | 1.5 km || 
|-id=123 bgcolor=#d6d6d6
| 579123 ||  || — || January 1, 2012 || Mount Lemmon || Mount Lemmon Survey ||  || align=right | 2.3 km || 
|-id=124 bgcolor=#d6d6d6
| 579124 ||  || — || May 4, 2008 || Sierra Stars || W. G. Dillon ||  || align=right | 2.8 km || 
|-id=125 bgcolor=#fefefe
| 579125 ||  || — || October 27, 2008 || Kitt Peak || Spacewatch ||  || align=right data-sort-value="0.74" | 740 m || 
|-id=126 bgcolor=#d6d6d6
| 579126 ||  || — || January 18, 2012 || Kitt Peak || Spacewatch ||  || align=right | 2.9 km || 
|-id=127 bgcolor=#fefefe
| 579127 ||  || — || July 1, 2014 || Haleakala || Pan-STARRS ||  || align=right data-sort-value="0.53" | 530 m || 
|-id=128 bgcolor=#d6d6d6
| 579128 ||  || — || November 26, 2009 || Kitt Peak || Spacewatch || 7:4 || align=right | 3.7 km || 
|-id=129 bgcolor=#fefefe
| 579129 ||  || — || July 2, 2014 || Haleakala || Pan-STARRS ||  || align=right data-sort-value="0.71" | 710 m || 
|-id=130 bgcolor=#E9E9E9
| 579130 ||  || — || September 18, 2010 || Mount Lemmon || Mount Lemmon Survey ||  || align=right | 1.3 km || 
|-id=131 bgcolor=#d6d6d6
| 579131 ||  || — || July 3, 2014 || Haleakala || Pan-STARRS ||  || align=right | 2.1 km || 
|-id=132 bgcolor=#fefefe
| 579132 ||  || — || August 28, 2003 || Palomar || NEAT ||  || align=right data-sort-value="0.86" | 860 m || 
|-id=133 bgcolor=#d6d6d6
| 579133 ||  || — || June 26, 2014 || Haleakala || Pan-STARRS ||  || align=right | 2.7 km || 
|-id=134 bgcolor=#fefefe
| 579134 ||  || — || August 24, 2007 || Kitt Peak || Spacewatch ||  || align=right data-sort-value="0.56" | 560 m || 
|-id=135 bgcolor=#fefefe
| 579135 ||  || — || July 7, 2014 || Haleakala || Pan-STARRS ||  || align=right data-sort-value="0.70" | 700 m || 
|-id=136 bgcolor=#fefefe
| 579136 ||  || — || June 24, 2014 || Mount Lemmon || Mount Lemmon Survey ||  || align=right data-sort-value="0.56" | 560 m || 
|-id=137 bgcolor=#d6d6d6
| 579137 ||  || — || May 15, 2013 || Haleakala || Pan-STARRS || 7:4 || align=right | 2.2 km || 
|-id=138 bgcolor=#d6d6d6
| 579138 ||  || — || February 27, 2012 || Haleakala || Pan-STARRS ||  || align=right | 2.7 km || 
|-id=139 bgcolor=#d6d6d6
| 579139 ||  || — || October 12, 2015 || Haleakala || Pan-STARRS ||  || align=right | 2.1 km || 
|-id=140 bgcolor=#fefefe
| 579140 ||  || — || August 6, 2007 || Lulin || LUSS ||  || align=right data-sort-value="0.59" | 590 m || 
|-id=141 bgcolor=#fefefe
| 579141 ||  || — || September 6, 2004 || Palomar || NEAT ||  || align=right data-sort-value="0.83" | 830 m || 
|-id=142 bgcolor=#d6d6d6
| 579142 ||  || — || July 4, 2014 || Haleakala || Pan-STARRS ||  || align=right | 2.1 km || 
|-id=143 bgcolor=#fefefe
| 579143 ||  || — || October 20, 2011 || Mount Lemmon || Mount Lemmon Survey ||  || align=right data-sort-value="0.54" | 540 m || 
|-id=144 bgcolor=#fefefe
| 579144 ||  || — || February 8, 2013 || Haleakala || Pan-STARRS ||  || align=right data-sort-value="0.64" | 640 m || 
|-id=145 bgcolor=#d6d6d6
| 579145 ||  || — || January 30, 2012 || Kitt Peak || Spacewatch ||  || align=right | 2.3 km || 
|-id=146 bgcolor=#fefefe
| 579146 ||  || — || July 24, 2003 || Palomar || NEAT ||  || align=right data-sort-value="0.62" | 620 m || 
|-id=147 bgcolor=#E9E9E9
| 579147 ||  || — || February 3, 2012 || Mount Lemmon || Mount Lemmon Survey ||  || align=right | 2.1 km || 
|-id=148 bgcolor=#d6d6d6
| 579148 ||  || — || March 16, 2013 || Kitt Peak || Spacewatch ||  || align=right | 2.3 km || 
|-id=149 bgcolor=#fefefe
| 579149 ||  || — || July 25, 2014 || Haleakala || Pan-STARRS ||  || align=right data-sort-value="0.71" | 710 m || 
|-id=150 bgcolor=#fefefe
| 579150 ||  || — || December 22, 2008 || Mount Lemmon || Mount Lemmon Survey ||  || align=right data-sort-value="0.64" | 640 m || 
|-id=151 bgcolor=#fefefe
| 579151 ||  || — || July 25, 2014 || Haleakala || Pan-STARRS ||  || align=right data-sort-value="0.86" | 860 m || 
|-id=152 bgcolor=#fefefe
| 579152 ||  || — || July 4, 2014 || Haleakala || Pan-STARRS ||  || align=right data-sort-value="0.54" | 540 m || 
|-id=153 bgcolor=#fefefe
| 579153 ||  || — || January 25, 2006 || Kitt Peak || Spacewatch ||  || align=right data-sort-value="0.68" | 680 m || 
|-id=154 bgcolor=#d6d6d6
| 579154 ||  || — || July 25, 2014 || Haleakala || Pan-STARRS ||  || align=right | 1.9 km || 
|-id=155 bgcolor=#fefefe
| 579155 ||  || — || June 27, 2014 || Haleakala || Pan-STARRS ||  || align=right data-sort-value="0.72" | 720 m || 
|-id=156 bgcolor=#d6d6d6
| 579156 ||  || — || September 19, 2009 || Mount Lemmon || Mount Lemmon Survey ||  || align=right | 2.3 km || 
|-id=157 bgcolor=#d6d6d6
| 579157 ||  || — || August 23, 2001 || Kitt Peak || Spacewatch || 7:4 || align=right | 3.0 km || 
|-id=158 bgcolor=#fefefe
| 579158 ||  || — || March 24, 2006 || Mount Lemmon || Mount Lemmon Survey ||  || align=right data-sort-value="0.71" | 710 m || 
|-id=159 bgcolor=#fefefe
| 579159 ||  || — || November 25, 2011 || Haleakala || Pan-STARRS ||  || align=right data-sort-value="0.59" | 590 m || 
|-id=160 bgcolor=#d6d6d6
| 579160 ||  || — || May 7, 2014 || Haleakala || Pan-STARRS ||  || align=right | 2.6 km || 
|-id=161 bgcolor=#fefefe
| 579161 ||  || — || September 18, 2003 || Kitt Peak || Spacewatch ||  || align=right data-sort-value="0.82" | 820 m || 
|-id=162 bgcolor=#fefefe
| 579162 ||  || — || September 21, 2011 || Kitt Peak || Spacewatch ||  || align=right data-sort-value="0.52" | 520 m || 
|-id=163 bgcolor=#d6d6d6
| 579163 ||  || — || July 26, 2014 || Haleakala || Pan-STARRS ||  || align=right | 2.2 km || 
|-id=164 bgcolor=#d6d6d6
| 579164 ||  || — || May 25, 2014 || Haleakala || Pan-STARRS ||  || align=right | 3.0 km || 
|-id=165 bgcolor=#fefefe
| 579165 ||  || — || November 1, 2008 || Mount Lemmon || Mount Lemmon Survey ||  || align=right data-sort-value="0.65" | 650 m || 
|-id=166 bgcolor=#fefefe
| 579166 ||  || — || July 4, 2014 || Haleakala || Pan-STARRS ||  || align=right data-sort-value="0.56" | 560 m || 
|-id=167 bgcolor=#fefefe
| 579167 ||  || — || January 16, 2005 || Mauna Kea || Mauna Kea Obs. || NYS || align=right data-sort-value="0.64" | 640 m || 
|-id=168 bgcolor=#d6d6d6
| 579168 ||  || — || August 16, 2009 || Kitt Peak || Spacewatch ||  || align=right | 2.1 km || 
|-id=169 bgcolor=#d6d6d6
| 579169 ||  || — || July 26, 2014 || Haleakala || Pan-STARRS || Tj (2.99) || align=right | 2.2 km || 
|-id=170 bgcolor=#fefefe
| 579170 ||  || — || November 1, 2011 || Charleston || R. Holmes ||  || align=right data-sort-value="0.64" | 640 m || 
|-id=171 bgcolor=#fefefe
| 579171 ||  || — || February 5, 2005 || Palomar || NEAT ||  || align=right data-sort-value="0.98" | 980 m || 
|-id=172 bgcolor=#d6d6d6
| 579172 ||  || — || January 26, 2012 || Kitt Peak || Spacewatch ||  || align=right | 2.6 km || 
|-id=173 bgcolor=#fefefe
| 579173 ||  || — || June 4, 2014 || Haleakala || Pan-STARRS ||  || align=right data-sort-value="0.61" | 610 m || 
|-id=174 bgcolor=#d6d6d6
| 579174 ||  || — || July 27, 2014 || Haleakala || Pan-STARRS ||  || align=right | 2.3 km || 
|-id=175 bgcolor=#fefefe
| 579175 ||  || — || June 28, 2014 || Haleakala || Pan-STARRS ||  || align=right data-sort-value="0.60" | 600 m || 
|-id=176 bgcolor=#fefefe
| 579176 ||  || — || September 18, 2003 || Kitt Peak || Spacewatch || NYS || align=right data-sort-value="0.52" | 520 m || 
|-id=177 bgcolor=#fefefe
| 579177 ||  || — || February 19, 2002 || Kitt Peak || Spacewatch ||  || align=right data-sort-value="0.70" | 700 m || 
|-id=178 bgcolor=#d6d6d6
| 579178 ||  || — || June 25, 2014 || Mount Lemmon || Mount Lemmon Survey ||  || align=right | 2.6 km || 
|-id=179 bgcolor=#d6d6d6
| 579179 ||  || — || July 3, 2014 || Haleakala || Pan-STARRS ||  || align=right | 2.0 km || 
|-id=180 bgcolor=#fefefe
| 579180 ||  || — || January 23, 2006 || Kitt Peak || Spacewatch ||  || align=right data-sort-value="0.69" | 690 m || 
|-id=181 bgcolor=#d6d6d6
| 579181 ||  || — || July 27, 2014 || Haleakala || Pan-STARRS ||  || align=right | 2.2 km || 
|-id=182 bgcolor=#d6d6d6
| 579182 ||  || — || July 27, 2014 || Haleakala || Pan-STARRS ||  || align=right | 2.1 km || 
|-id=183 bgcolor=#d6d6d6
| 579183 ||  || — || January 30, 2012 || Mount Lemmon || Mount Lemmon Survey || VER || align=right | 2.0 km || 
|-id=184 bgcolor=#d6d6d6
| 579184 ||  || — || July 27, 2014 || Haleakala || Pan-STARRS ||  || align=right | 2.7 km || 
|-id=185 bgcolor=#fefefe
| 579185 ||  || — || July 27, 2014 || Haleakala || Pan-STARRS ||  || align=right data-sort-value="0.71" | 710 m || 
|-id=186 bgcolor=#fefefe
| 579186 ||  || — || July 27, 2014 || Haleakala || Pan-STARRS ||  || align=right data-sort-value="0.62" | 620 m || 
|-id=187 bgcolor=#fefefe
| 579187 ||  || — || December 22, 2008 || Kitt Peak || Spacewatch ||  || align=right data-sort-value="0.61" | 610 m || 
|-id=188 bgcolor=#d6d6d6
| 579188 ||  || — || July 27, 2014 || Haleakala || Pan-STARRS ||  || align=right | 2.2 km || 
|-id=189 bgcolor=#fefefe
| 579189 ||  || — || July 27, 2014 || Haleakala || Pan-STARRS ||  || align=right data-sort-value="0.74" | 740 m || 
|-id=190 bgcolor=#fefefe
| 579190 ||  || — || April 10, 2013 || Mount Lemmon || Mount Lemmon Survey ||  || align=right data-sort-value="0.68" | 680 m || 
|-id=191 bgcolor=#fefefe
| 579191 ||  || — || March 13, 2010 || Kitt Peak || Spacewatch ||  || align=right data-sort-value="0.53" | 530 m || 
|-id=192 bgcolor=#fefefe
| 579192 ||  || — || August 31, 2011 || Piszkesteto || K. Sárneczky ||  || align=right data-sort-value="0.75" | 750 m || 
|-id=193 bgcolor=#fefefe
| 579193 ||  || — || April 15, 2010 || Kitt Peak || Spacewatch ||  || align=right data-sort-value="0.67" | 670 m || 
|-id=194 bgcolor=#fefefe
| 579194 ||  || — || June 28, 2014 || Haleakala || Pan-STARRS ||  || align=right data-sort-value="0.60" | 600 m || 
|-id=195 bgcolor=#fefefe
| 579195 ||  || — || July 23, 2007 || Lulin || LUSS ||  || align=right data-sort-value="0.82" | 820 m || 
|-id=196 bgcolor=#d6d6d6
| 579196 ||  || — || July 27, 2014 || Haleakala || Pan-STARRS ||  || align=right | 2.3 km || 
|-id=197 bgcolor=#fefefe
| 579197 ||  || — || April 28, 2006 || Cerro Tololo || Cerro Tololo Obs. ||  || align=right data-sort-value="0.63" | 630 m || 
|-id=198 bgcolor=#fefefe
| 579198 ||  || — || January 7, 2006 || Kitt Peak || Spacewatch ||  || align=right data-sort-value="0.60" | 600 m || 
|-id=199 bgcolor=#d6d6d6
| 579199 ||  || — || July 27, 2014 || Haleakala || Pan-STARRS || 3:2 || align=right | 3.9 km || 
|-id=200 bgcolor=#fefefe
| 579200 ||  || — || July 27, 2014 || Haleakala || Pan-STARRS ||  || align=right data-sort-value="0.71" | 710 m || 
|}

579201–579300 

|-bgcolor=#d6d6d6
| 579201 ||  || — || May 7, 2014 || Haleakala || Pan-STARRS ||  || align=right | 2.9 km || 
|-id=202 bgcolor=#fefefe
| 579202 ||  || — || December 5, 2008 || Mount Lemmon || Mount Lemmon Survey ||  || align=right data-sort-value="0.51" | 510 m || 
|-id=203 bgcolor=#fefefe
| 579203 ||  || — || November 24, 2011 || Haleakala || Pan-STARRS ||  || align=right data-sort-value="0.73" | 730 m || 
|-id=204 bgcolor=#E9E9E9
| 579204 ||  || — || November 23, 2006 || Mount Lemmon || Mount Lemmon Survey ||  || align=right data-sort-value="0.74" | 740 m || 
|-id=205 bgcolor=#d6d6d6
| 579205 ||  || — || July 27, 2014 || Haleakala || Pan-STARRS || Tj (2.99) || align=right | 3.1 km || 
|-id=206 bgcolor=#d6d6d6
| 579206 ||  || — || March 28, 2014 || Mount Lemmon || Mount Lemmon Survey ||  || align=right | 2.2 km || 
|-id=207 bgcolor=#d6d6d6
| 579207 ||  || — || February 21, 2007 || Mount Lemmon || Mount Lemmon Survey ||  || align=right | 3.1 km || 
|-id=208 bgcolor=#d6d6d6
| 579208 ||  || — || September 13, 2004 || Kitt Peak || Spacewatch ||  || align=right | 3.2 km || 
|-id=209 bgcolor=#fefefe
| 579209 ||  || — || September 20, 2003 || Kitt Peak || Spacewatch || MAS || align=right data-sort-value="0.52" | 520 m || 
|-id=210 bgcolor=#d6d6d6
| 579210 ||  || — || September 6, 2008 || Mount Lemmon || Mount Lemmon Survey || 7:4 || align=right | 3.2 km || 
|-id=211 bgcolor=#fefefe
| 579211 ||  || — || March 16, 2010 || Mount Lemmon || Mount Lemmon Survey ||  || align=right data-sort-value="0.50" | 500 m || 
|-id=212 bgcolor=#fefefe
| 579212 ||  || — || July 29, 2014 || Haleakala || Pan-STARRS ||  || align=right data-sort-value="0.55" | 550 m || 
|-id=213 bgcolor=#fefefe
| 579213 ||  || — || October 1, 2011 || Mount Lemmon || Mount Lemmon Survey ||  || align=right data-sort-value="0.81" | 810 m || 
|-id=214 bgcolor=#d6d6d6
| 579214 ||  || — || August 18, 2009 || Kitt Peak || Spacewatch ||  || align=right | 2.4 km || 
|-id=215 bgcolor=#fefefe
| 579215 ||  || — || April 11, 2003 || Kitt Peak || Spacewatch ||  || align=right data-sort-value="0.55" | 550 m || 
|-id=216 bgcolor=#fefefe
| 579216 ||  || — || October 19, 2011 || Kitt Peak || Spacewatch || V || align=right data-sort-value="0.47" | 470 m || 
|-id=217 bgcolor=#fefefe
| 579217 ||  || — || October 1, 2011 || Mount Lemmon || Mount Lemmon Survey ||  || align=right data-sort-value="0.73" | 730 m || 
|-id=218 bgcolor=#fefefe
| 579218 ||  || — || July 29, 2014 || Haleakala || Pan-STARRS ||  || align=right data-sort-value="0.69" | 690 m || 
|-id=219 bgcolor=#fefefe
| 579219 ||  || — || November 14, 1995 || Kitt Peak || Spacewatch ||  || align=right data-sort-value="0.52" | 520 m || 
|-id=220 bgcolor=#fefefe
| 579220 ||  || — || February 18, 2013 || Kitt Peak || Spacewatch ||  || align=right data-sort-value="0.79" | 790 m || 
|-id=221 bgcolor=#d6d6d6
| 579221 ||  || — || November 19, 2003 || Palomar || NEAT || 7:4 || align=right | 4.3 km || 
|-id=222 bgcolor=#fefefe
| 579222 ||  || — || October 26, 2011 || Haleakala || Pan-STARRS ||  || align=right data-sort-value="0.59" | 590 m || 
|-id=223 bgcolor=#fefefe
| 579223 ||  || — || December 6, 2011 || Haleakala || Pan-STARRS ||  || align=right data-sort-value="0.69" | 690 m || 
|-id=224 bgcolor=#fefefe
| 579224 ||  || — || July 24, 2007 || Lulin || LUSS ||  || align=right data-sort-value="0.76" | 760 m || 
|-id=225 bgcolor=#fefefe
| 579225 ||  || — || December 26, 2001 || Haleakala || AMOS ||  || align=right | 3.1 km || 
|-id=226 bgcolor=#fefefe
| 579226 ||  || — || August 6, 2007 || Lulin || LUSS ||  || align=right data-sort-value="0.85" | 850 m || 
|-id=227 bgcolor=#fefefe
| 579227 ||  || — || October 26, 2008 || Mount Lemmon || Mount Lemmon Survey ||  || align=right data-sort-value="0.63" | 630 m || 
|-id=228 bgcolor=#fefefe
| 579228 ||  || — || September 23, 2011 || Haleakala || Pan-STARRS ||  || align=right data-sort-value="0.56" | 560 m || 
|-id=229 bgcolor=#d6d6d6
| 579229 ||  || — || July 7, 2014 || Haleakala || Pan-STARRS ||  || align=right | 2.0 km || 
|-id=230 bgcolor=#fefefe
| 579230 ||  || — || July 7, 2014 || Haleakala || Pan-STARRS ||  || align=right data-sort-value="0.61" | 610 m || 
|-id=231 bgcolor=#d6d6d6
| 579231 ||  || — || April 10, 2013 || Haleakala || Pan-STARRS ||  || align=right | 2.0 km || 
|-id=232 bgcolor=#fefefe
| 579232 ||  || — || October 12, 2007 || Mount Lemmon || Mount Lemmon Survey ||  || align=right data-sort-value="0.67" | 670 m || 
|-id=233 bgcolor=#fefefe
| 579233 ||  || — || March 4, 2010 || Kitt Peak || Spacewatch ||  || align=right data-sort-value="0.50" | 500 m || 
|-id=234 bgcolor=#fefefe
| 579234 ||  || — || October 26, 2011 || Haleakala || Pan-STARRS ||  || align=right data-sort-value="0.77" | 770 m || 
|-id=235 bgcolor=#d6d6d6
| 579235 ||  || — || September 17, 2003 || Kitt Peak || Spacewatch ||  || align=right | 2.1 km || 
|-id=236 bgcolor=#d6d6d6
| 579236 ||  || — || June 25, 2014 || Mount Lemmon || Mount Lemmon Survey ||  || align=right | 2.4 km || 
|-id=237 bgcolor=#fefefe
| 579237 ||  || — || July 3, 2014 || Haleakala || Pan-STARRS ||  || align=right data-sort-value="0.63" | 630 m || 
|-id=238 bgcolor=#fefefe
| 579238 ||  || — || September 20, 2007 || Kitt Peak || Spacewatch ||  || align=right data-sort-value="0.65" | 650 m || 
|-id=239 bgcolor=#fefefe
| 579239 ||  || — || October 24, 2011 || Haleakala || Pan-STARRS ||  || align=right data-sort-value="0.64" | 640 m || 
|-id=240 bgcolor=#d6d6d6
| 579240 ||  || — || June 30, 2014 || Haleakala || Pan-STARRS ||  || align=right | 2.1 km || 
|-id=241 bgcolor=#fefefe
| 579241 ||  || — || March 20, 1999 || Apache Point || SDSS Collaboration ||  || align=right data-sort-value="0.75" | 750 m || 
|-id=242 bgcolor=#fefefe
| 579242 ||  || — || March 5, 2013 || Mount Lemmon || Mount Lemmon Survey ||  || align=right data-sort-value="0.62" | 620 m || 
|-id=243 bgcolor=#E9E9E9
| 579243 ||  || — || July 25, 2014 || Haleakala || Pan-STARRS ||  || align=right | 1.8 km || 
|-id=244 bgcolor=#E9E9E9
| 579244 ||  || — || September 10, 2010 || Kitt Peak || Spacewatch ||  || align=right | 1.2 km || 
|-id=245 bgcolor=#fefefe
| 579245 ||  || — || July 25, 2014 || Haleakala || Pan-STARRS ||  || align=right data-sort-value="0.63" | 630 m || 
|-id=246 bgcolor=#C2E0FF
| 579246 ||  || — || July 27, 2014 || Haleakala || Pan-STARRS || plutinocritical || align=right | 119 km || 
|-id=247 bgcolor=#d6d6d6
| 579247 ||  || — || July 26, 2014 || Haleakala || Pan-STARRS ||  || align=right | 2.5 km || 
|-id=248 bgcolor=#fefefe
| 579248 ||  || — || July 25, 2014 || Haleakala || Pan-STARRS ||  || align=right data-sort-value="0.62" | 620 m || 
|-id=249 bgcolor=#d6d6d6
| 579249 ||  || — || May 7, 2014 || Haleakala || Pan-STARRS || Tj (2.92) || align=right | 3.5 km || 
|-id=250 bgcolor=#fefefe
| 579250 ||  || — || August 1, 2014 || Haleakala || Pan-STARRS ||  || align=right data-sort-value="0.58" | 580 m || 
|-id=251 bgcolor=#fefefe
| 579251 ||  || — || September 12, 2007 || Mount Lemmon || Mount Lemmon Survey ||  || align=right data-sort-value="0.59" | 590 m || 
|-id=252 bgcolor=#fefefe
| 579252 ||  || — || October 13, 2007 || Mount Lemmon || Mount Lemmon Survey ||  || align=right data-sort-value="0.52" | 520 m || 
|-id=253 bgcolor=#fefefe
| 579253 ||  || — || August 26, 2000 || Cerro Tololo || R. Millis, L. H. Wasserman ||  || align=right data-sort-value="0.62" | 620 m || 
|-id=254 bgcolor=#fefefe
| 579254 ||  || — || November 11, 2004 || Kitt Peak || Kitt Peak Obs. ||  || align=right data-sort-value="0.64" | 640 m || 
|-id=255 bgcolor=#fefefe
| 579255 ||  || — || October 9, 2007 || Mount Lemmon || Mount Lemmon Survey ||  || align=right data-sort-value="0.50" | 500 m || 
|-id=256 bgcolor=#fefefe
| 579256 ||  || — || February 15, 2002 || Bohyunsan || Y.-B. Jeon, H. S. Hwang ||  || align=right data-sort-value="0.57" | 570 m || 
|-id=257 bgcolor=#fefefe
| 579257 ||  || — || December 2, 2004 || Palomar || NEAT ||  || align=right data-sort-value="0.90" | 900 m || 
|-id=258 bgcolor=#fefefe
| 579258 ||  || — || November 16, 2003 || Kitt Peak || Spacewatch ||  || align=right data-sort-value="0.65" | 650 m || 
|-id=259 bgcolor=#fefefe
| 579259 ||  || — || October 8, 2004 || Kitt Peak || Spacewatch ||  || align=right data-sort-value="0.64" | 640 m || 
|-id=260 bgcolor=#d6d6d6
| 579260 ||  || — || May 10, 2014 || Haleakala || Pan-STARRS ||  || align=right | 2.4 km || 
|-id=261 bgcolor=#fefefe
| 579261 ||  || — || July 28, 2014 || Haleakala || Pan-STARRS ||  || align=right data-sort-value="0.57" | 570 m || 
|-id=262 bgcolor=#d6d6d6
| 579262 ||  || — || October 26, 2005 || Kitt Peak || Spacewatch ||  || align=right | 2.4 km || 
|-id=263 bgcolor=#fefefe
| 579263 ||  || — || August 3, 2014 || Haleakala || Pan-STARRS ||  || align=right data-sort-value="0.65" | 650 m || 
|-id=264 bgcolor=#fefefe
| 579264 ||  || — || June 29, 2014 || Haleakala || Pan-STARRS ||  || align=right data-sort-value="0.57" | 570 m || 
|-id=265 bgcolor=#fefefe
| 579265 ||  || — || September 22, 2011 || Kitt Peak || Spacewatch ||  || align=right data-sort-value="0.73" | 730 m || 
|-id=266 bgcolor=#fefefe
| 579266 ||  || — || August 15, 2014 || Haleakala || Pan-STARRS ||  || align=right data-sort-value="0.75" | 750 m || 
|-id=267 bgcolor=#d6d6d6
| 579267 ||  || — || August 3, 2014 || Haleakala || Pan-STARRS ||  || align=right | 2.2 km || 
|-id=268 bgcolor=#FA8072
| 579268 ||  || — || July 15, 2007 || Siding Spring || SSS ||  || align=right data-sort-value="0.81" | 810 m || 
|-id=269 bgcolor=#fefefe
| 579269 ||  || — || May 28, 2014 || Mount Lemmon || Mount Lemmon Survey || H || align=right data-sort-value="0.57" | 570 m || 
|-id=270 bgcolor=#d6d6d6
| 579270 ||  || — || May 7, 2014 || Haleakala || Pan-STARRS ||  || align=right | 2.4 km || 
|-id=271 bgcolor=#fefefe
| 579271 ||  || — || October 8, 2011 || Charleston || R. Holmes ||  || align=right data-sort-value="0.85" | 850 m || 
|-id=272 bgcolor=#E9E9E9
| 579272 ||  || — || July 10, 2014 || Haleakala || Pan-STARRS ||  || align=right | 1.9 km || 
|-id=273 bgcolor=#fefefe
| 579273 ||  || — || July 1, 2014 || Kitt Peak || Spacewatch ||  || align=right data-sort-value="0.62" | 620 m || 
|-id=274 bgcolor=#fefefe
| 579274 ||  || — || September 11, 2007 || Mount Lemmon || Mount Lemmon Survey ||  || align=right data-sort-value="0.59" | 590 m || 
|-id=275 bgcolor=#fefefe
| 579275 ||  || — || March 5, 2013 || Mount Lemmon || Mount Lemmon Survey ||  || align=right data-sort-value="0.62" | 620 m || 
|-id=276 bgcolor=#fefefe
| 579276 ||  || — || October 18, 2007 || Kitt Peak || Spacewatch ||  || align=right data-sort-value="0.73" | 730 m || 
|-id=277 bgcolor=#d6d6d6
| 579277 ||  || — || August 20, 2014 || Haleakala || Pan-STARRS ||  || align=right | 2.7 km || 
|-id=278 bgcolor=#d6d6d6
| 579278 ||  || — || January 19, 2012 || Haleakala || Pan-STARRS ||  || align=right | 2.5 km || 
|-id=279 bgcolor=#fefefe
| 579279 ||  || — || March 6, 2013 || Haleakala || Pan-STARRS ||  || align=right data-sort-value="0.74" | 740 m || 
|-id=280 bgcolor=#fefefe
| 579280 ||  || — || October 2, 2011 || Bergisch Gladbach || W. Bickel ||  || align=right data-sort-value="0.72" | 720 m || 
|-id=281 bgcolor=#fefefe
| 579281 ||  || — || August 20, 2014 || Haleakala || Pan-STARRS ||  || align=right data-sort-value="0.55" | 550 m || 
|-id=282 bgcolor=#d6d6d6
| 579282 ||  || — || February 12, 2002 || Kitt Peak || Spacewatch ||  || align=right | 2.1 km || 
|-id=283 bgcolor=#d6d6d6
| 579283 ||  || — || July 28, 2014 || Haleakala || Pan-STARRS ||  || align=right | 1.8 km || 
|-id=284 bgcolor=#fefefe
| 579284 ||  || — || February 17, 2013 || Mount Lemmon || Mount Lemmon Survey ||  || align=right data-sort-value="0.55" | 550 m || 
|-id=285 bgcolor=#d6d6d6
| 579285 ||  || — || July 28, 2014 || Haleakala || Pan-STARRS ||  || align=right | 2.1 km || 
|-id=286 bgcolor=#fefefe
| 579286 ||  || — || November 17, 2011 || Mount Lemmon || Mount Lemmon Survey ||  || align=right data-sort-value="0.61" | 610 m || 
|-id=287 bgcolor=#d6d6d6
| 579287 ||  || — || September 17, 2009 || Kitt Peak || Spacewatch || LIX || align=right | 2.3 km || 
|-id=288 bgcolor=#d6d6d6
| 579288 ||  || — || August 20, 2014 || Haleakala || Pan-STARRS ||  || align=right | 2.4 km || 
|-id=289 bgcolor=#E9E9E9
| 579289 ||  || — || September 11, 2010 || Mount Lemmon || Mount Lemmon Survey ||  || align=right | 2.3 km || 
|-id=290 bgcolor=#d6d6d6
| 579290 ||  || — || June 24, 2014 || Haleakala || Pan-STARRS ||  || align=right | 3.2 km || 
|-id=291 bgcolor=#fefefe
| 579291 ||  || — || February 19, 2009 || Catalina || CSS ||  || align=right data-sort-value="0.75" | 750 m || 
|-id=292 bgcolor=#fefefe
| 579292 ||  || — || February 2, 2006 || Kitt Peak || Spacewatch ||  || align=right data-sort-value="0.59" | 590 m || 
|-id=293 bgcolor=#fefefe
| 579293 ||  || — || October 27, 2003 || Kitt Peak || Spacewatch ||  || align=right data-sort-value="0.86" | 860 m || 
|-id=294 bgcolor=#d6d6d6
| 579294 ||  || — || June 30, 2014 || Haleakala || Pan-STARRS ||  || align=right | 2.2 km || 
|-id=295 bgcolor=#d6d6d6
| 579295 ||  || — || August 20, 2014 || Haleakala || Pan-STARRS ||  || align=right | 2.0 km || 
|-id=296 bgcolor=#fefefe
| 579296 ||  || — || October 1, 2011 || Kitt Peak || Spacewatch ||  || align=right data-sort-value="0.83" | 830 m || 
|-id=297 bgcolor=#fefefe
| 579297 ||  || — || March 12, 2005 || Kitt Peak || M. W. Buie, L. H. Wasserman ||  || align=right data-sort-value="0.62" | 620 m || 
|-id=298 bgcolor=#fefefe
| 579298 ||  || — || October 24, 2008 || Kitt Peak || Spacewatch ||  || align=right data-sort-value="0.48" | 480 m || 
|-id=299 bgcolor=#fefefe
| 579299 ||  || — || January 2, 2012 || Mount Lemmon || Mount Lemmon Survey ||  || align=right data-sort-value="0.59" | 590 m || 
|-id=300 bgcolor=#d6d6d6
| 579300 ||  || — || July 28, 2014 || Haleakala || Pan-STARRS ||  || align=right | 2.1 km || 
|}

579301–579400 

|-bgcolor=#fefefe
| 579301 ||  || — || September 29, 2003 || Kitt Peak || Spacewatch || MAS || align=right data-sort-value="0.65" | 650 m || 
|-id=302 bgcolor=#fefefe
| 579302 ||  || — || March 6, 2013 || Haleakala || Pan-STARRS ||  || align=right data-sort-value="0.63" | 630 m || 
|-id=303 bgcolor=#fefefe
| 579303 ||  || — || July 28, 2014 || Haleakala || Pan-STARRS ||  || align=right data-sort-value="0.62" | 620 m || 
|-id=304 bgcolor=#E9E9E9
| 579304 ||  || — || August 3, 2014 || Haleakala || Pan-STARRS ||  || align=right | 1.4 km || 
|-id=305 bgcolor=#fefefe
| 579305 ||  || — || March 30, 2003 || Kitt Peak || Spacewatch ||  || align=right | 1.0 km || 
|-id=306 bgcolor=#fefefe
| 579306 ||  || — || January 14, 2012 || Catalina || CSS ||  || align=right data-sort-value="0.80" | 800 m || 
|-id=307 bgcolor=#fefefe
| 579307 ||  || — || June 3, 2014 || Haleakala || Pan-STARRS ||  || align=right data-sort-value="0.89" | 890 m || 
|-id=308 bgcolor=#fefefe
| 579308 ||  || — || May 9, 2013 || Haleakala || Pan-STARRS ||  || align=right data-sort-value="0.80" | 800 m || 
|-id=309 bgcolor=#d6d6d6
| 579309 ||  || — || June 29, 2014 || Haleakala || Pan-STARRS ||  || align=right | 2.3 km || 
|-id=310 bgcolor=#fefefe
| 579310 ||  || — || October 1, 2011 || Kitt Peak || Spacewatch ||  || align=right data-sort-value="0.60" | 600 m || 
|-id=311 bgcolor=#fefefe
| 579311 ||  || — || March 2, 2006 || Mount Lemmon || Mount Lemmon Survey ||  || align=right data-sort-value="0.75" | 750 m || 
|-id=312 bgcolor=#fefefe
| 579312 ||  || — || May 9, 2014 || Haleakala || Pan-STARRS ||  || align=right data-sort-value="0.64" | 640 m || 
|-id=313 bgcolor=#fefefe
| 579313 ||  || — || September 29, 2011 || Mount Lemmon || Mount Lemmon Survey ||  || align=right data-sort-value="0.76" | 760 m || 
|-id=314 bgcolor=#d6d6d6
| 579314 ||  || — || September 21, 2003 || Kitt Peak || Spacewatch ||  || align=right | 2.7 km || 
|-id=315 bgcolor=#d6d6d6
| 579315 ||  || — || December 13, 2010 || Mount Lemmon || Mount Lemmon Survey ||  || align=right | 3.6 km || 
|-id=316 bgcolor=#d6d6d6
| 579316 ||  || — || December 25, 2010 || Mount Lemmon || Mount Lemmon Survey ||  || align=right | 2.8 km || 
|-id=317 bgcolor=#fefefe
| 579317 ||  || — || September 29, 2003 || Anderson Mesa || LONEOS ||  || align=right data-sort-value="0.76" | 760 m || 
|-id=318 bgcolor=#fefefe
| 579318 ||  || — || February 15, 2013 || Haleakala || Pan-STARRS ||  || align=right data-sort-value="0.66" | 660 m || 
|-id=319 bgcolor=#fefefe
| 579319 ||  || — || August 23, 2007 || Kitt Peak || Spacewatch ||  || align=right data-sort-value="0.59" | 590 m || 
|-id=320 bgcolor=#fefefe
| 579320 ||  || — || September 9, 2007 || Kitt Peak || Spacewatch ||  || align=right data-sort-value="0.64" | 640 m || 
|-id=321 bgcolor=#fefefe
| 579321 ||  || — || August 22, 2014 || Haleakala || Pan-STARRS ||  || align=right data-sort-value="0.65" | 650 m || 
|-id=322 bgcolor=#fefefe
| 579322 ||  || — || October 19, 2007 || Kitt Peak || Spacewatch ||  || align=right data-sort-value="0.82" | 820 m || 
|-id=323 bgcolor=#d6d6d6
| 579323 ||  || — || August 22, 2014 || Haleakala || Pan-STARRS ||  || align=right | 2.5 km || 
|-id=324 bgcolor=#fefefe
| 579324 ||  || — || February 28, 2006 || Mount Lemmon || Mount Lemmon Survey ||  || align=right data-sort-value="0.59" | 590 m || 
|-id=325 bgcolor=#fefefe
| 579325 ||  || — || September 19, 2007 || Kitt Peak || Spacewatch ||  || align=right data-sort-value="0.56" | 560 m || 
|-id=326 bgcolor=#fefefe
| 579326 ||  || — || October 24, 2011 || Kitt Peak || Spacewatch ||  || align=right data-sort-value="0.50" | 500 m || 
|-id=327 bgcolor=#fefefe
| 579327 ||  || — || February 13, 2013 || Haleakala || Pan-STARRS ||  || align=right data-sort-value="0.67" | 670 m || 
|-id=328 bgcolor=#fefefe
| 579328 ||  || — || August 22, 2014 || Haleakala || Pan-STARRS ||  || align=right data-sort-value="0.70" | 700 m || 
|-id=329 bgcolor=#fefefe
| 579329 ||  || — || March 19, 2013 || Haleakala || Pan-STARRS ||  || align=right data-sort-value="0.67" | 670 m || 
|-id=330 bgcolor=#fefefe
| 579330 ||  || — || December 25, 2011 || Kitt Peak || Spacewatch ||  || align=right data-sort-value="0.83" | 830 m || 
|-id=331 bgcolor=#d6d6d6
| 579331 ||  || — || February 5, 2011 || Mount Lemmon || Mount Lemmon Survey ||  || align=right | 2.7 km || 
|-id=332 bgcolor=#fefefe
| 579332 ||  || — || August 22, 2014 || Haleakala || Pan-STARRS ||  || align=right data-sort-value="0.75" | 750 m || 
|-id=333 bgcolor=#fefefe
| 579333 ||  || — || March 15, 2013 || Mount Lemmon || Mount Lemmon Survey ||  || align=right data-sort-value="0.77" | 770 m || 
|-id=334 bgcolor=#fefefe
| 579334 ||  || — || January 21, 2013 || Haleakala || Pan-STARRS || H || align=right data-sort-value="0.42" | 420 m || 
|-id=335 bgcolor=#fefefe
| 579335 ||  || — || October 20, 2011 || Mount Lemmon || Mount Lemmon Survey ||  || align=right data-sort-value="0.75" | 750 m || 
|-id=336 bgcolor=#d6d6d6
| 579336 ||  || — || August 25, 2014 || Haleakala || Pan-STARRS ||  || align=right | 2.5 km || 
|-id=337 bgcolor=#E9E9E9
| 579337 ||  || — || May 3, 2013 || Haleakala || Pan-STARRS ||  || align=right data-sort-value="0.96" | 960 m || 
|-id=338 bgcolor=#d6d6d6
| 579338 ||  || — || August 25, 2014 || Haleakala || Pan-STARRS || 7:4 || align=right | 3.5 km || 
|-id=339 bgcolor=#fefefe
| 579339 ||  || — || November 9, 2004 || Catalina || CSS ||  || align=right | 1.1 km || 
|-id=340 bgcolor=#fefefe
| 579340 ||  || — || June 30, 2014 || Catalina || CSS ||  || align=right data-sort-value="0.91" | 910 m || 
|-id=341 bgcolor=#fefefe
| 579341 ||  || — || July 31, 2014 || Haleakala || Pan-STARRS ||  || align=right data-sort-value="0.69" | 690 m || 
|-id=342 bgcolor=#fefefe
| 579342 ||  || — || July 31, 2014 || Haleakala || Pan-STARRS ||  || align=right data-sort-value="0.72" | 720 m || 
|-id=343 bgcolor=#fefefe
| 579343 ||  || — || October 11, 2007 || Mount Lemmon || Mount Lemmon Survey ||  || align=right data-sort-value="0.69" | 690 m || 
|-id=344 bgcolor=#fefefe
| 579344 ||  || — || June 24, 2014 || Haleakala || Pan-STARRS ||  || align=right data-sort-value="0.78" | 780 m || 
|-id=345 bgcolor=#fefefe
| 579345 ||  || — || June 28, 2003 || Socorro || LINEAR ||  || align=right | 1.1 km || 
|-id=346 bgcolor=#fefefe
| 579346 ||  || — || October 19, 2011 || Kitt Peak || Spacewatch ||  || align=right data-sort-value="0.83" | 830 m || 
|-id=347 bgcolor=#fefefe
| 579347 ||  || — || October 19, 2011 || Mount Lemmon || Mount Lemmon Survey ||  || align=right data-sort-value="0.55" | 550 m || 
|-id=348 bgcolor=#fefefe
| 579348 ||  || — || January 20, 2009 || Kitt Peak || Spacewatch ||  || align=right data-sort-value="0.82" | 820 m || 
|-id=349 bgcolor=#fefefe
| 579349 ||  || — || March 23, 2006 || Mount Lemmon || Mount Lemmon Survey ||  || align=right data-sort-value="0.86" | 860 m || 
|-id=350 bgcolor=#fefefe
| 579350 ||  || — || September 30, 2003 || Kitt Peak || Spacewatch ||  || align=right data-sort-value="0.67" | 670 m || 
|-id=351 bgcolor=#fefefe
| 579351 ||  || — || October 10, 2007 || Kitt Peak || Spacewatch ||  || align=right data-sort-value="0.62" | 620 m || 
|-id=352 bgcolor=#fefefe
| 579352 ||  || — || July 30, 2014 || Haleakala || Pan-STARRS ||  || align=right data-sort-value="0.73" | 730 m || 
|-id=353 bgcolor=#fefefe
| 579353 ||  || — || March 25, 2009 || La Sagra || OAM Obs. ||  || align=right data-sort-value="0.81" | 810 m || 
|-id=354 bgcolor=#fefefe
| 579354 ||  || — || February 27, 2009 || Kitt Peak || Spacewatch ||  || align=right data-sort-value="0.85" | 850 m || 
|-id=355 bgcolor=#fefefe
| 579355 ||  || — || September 1, 2010 || Mount Lemmon || Mount Lemmon Survey ||  || align=right data-sort-value="0.82" | 820 m || 
|-id=356 bgcolor=#fefefe
| 579356 ||  || — || August 25, 2014 || Haleakala || Pan-STARRS ||  || align=right data-sort-value="0.56" | 560 m || 
|-id=357 bgcolor=#d6d6d6
| 579357 ||  || — || August 26, 2014 || Haleakala || Pan-STARRS ||  || align=right | 2.9 km || 
|-id=358 bgcolor=#d6d6d6
| 579358 ||  || — || August 27, 2014 || Haleakala || Pan-STARRS ||  || align=right | 2.2 km || 
|-id=359 bgcolor=#fefefe
| 579359 ||  || — || August 27, 2014 || Haleakala || Pan-STARRS ||  || align=right data-sort-value="0.45" | 450 m || 
|-id=360 bgcolor=#fefefe
| 579360 ||  || — || September 12, 2007 || Mount Lemmon || Mount Lemmon Survey ||  || align=right data-sort-value="0.60" | 600 m || 
|-id=361 bgcolor=#fefefe
| 579361 ||  || — || February 2, 2005 || Kitt Peak || Spacewatch ||  || align=right data-sort-value="0.74" | 740 m || 
|-id=362 bgcolor=#fefefe
| 579362 ||  || — || January 3, 2012 || Mount Lemmon || Mount Lemmon Survey ||  || align=right data-sort-value="0.75" | 750 m || 
|-id=363 bgcolor=#fefefe
| 579363 ||  || — || August 25, 2014 || Haleakala || Pan-STARRS ||  || align=right data-sort-value="0.68" | 680 m || 
|-id=364 bgcolor=#fefefe
| 579364 ||  || — || August 25, 2014 || Haleakala || Pan-STARRS || V || align=right data-sort-value="0.52" | 520 m || 
|-id=365 bgcolor=#fefefe
| 579365 ||  || — || October 10, 2007 || Kitt Peak || Spacewatch ||  || align=right data-sort-value="0.55" | 550 m || 
|-id=366 bgcolor=#fefefe
| 579366 ||  || — || October 23, 2003 || Apache Point || SDSS Collaboration ||  || align=right data-sort-value="0.67" | 670 m || 
|-id=367 bgcolor=#d6d6d6
| 579367 ||  || — || September 6, 2008 || Mount Lemmon || Mount Lemmon Survey ||  || align=right | 2.8 km || 
|-id=368 bgcolor=#fefefe
| 579368 ||  || — || September 14, 2007 || Anderson Mesa || LONEOS ||  || align=right data-sort-value="0.88" | 880 m || 
|-id=369 bgcolor=#fefefe
| 579369 ||  || — || September 29, 2000 || Kitt Peak || Spacewatch ||  || align=right data-sort-value="0.82" | 820 m || 
|-id=370 bgcolor=#d6d6d6
| 579370 ||  || — || February 25, 2011 || Mount Lemmon || Mount Lemmon Survey ||  || align=right | 2.1 km || 
|-id=371 bgcolor=#FA8072
| 579371 ||  || — || December 11, 2012 || Charleston || R. Holmes ||  || align=right | 1.3 km || 
|-id=372 bgcolor=#E9E9E9
| 579372 ||  || — || September 17, 2010 || Kitt Peak || Spacewatch || BRG || align=right | 1.1 km || 
|-id=373 bgcolor=#fefefe
| 579373 ||  || — || September 26, 2003 || Apache Point || SDSS Collaboration ||  || align=right data-sort-value="0.68" | 680 m || 
|-id=374 bgcolor=#fefefe
| 579374 ||  || — || October 23, 2003 || Kitt Peak || Spacewatch ||  || align=right data-sort-value="0.73" | 730 m || 
|-id=375 bgcolor=#d6d6d6
| 579375 ||  || — || March 29, 2012 || Mount Lemmon || Mount Lemmon Survey ||  || align=right | 2.5 km || 
|-id=376 bgcolor=#fefefe
| 579376 ||  || — || January 16, 2005 || Mauna Kea || Mauna Kea Obs. ||  || align=right data-sort-value="0.68" | 680 m || 
|-id=377 bgcolor=#fefefe
| 579377 ||  || — || August 22, 2007 || Anderson Mesa || LONEOS ||  || align=right data-sort-value="0.61" | 610 m || 
|-id=378 bgcolor=#fefefe
| 579378 ||  || — || September 21, 2003 || Kitt Peak || Spacewatch ||  || align=right data-sort-value="0.70" | 700 m || 
|-id=379 bgcolor=#fefefe
| 579379 ||  || — || August 28, 2014 || Haleakala || Pan-STARRS ||  || align=right data-sort-value="0.62" | 620 m || 
|-id=380 bgcolor=#d6d6d6
| 579380 ||  || — || January 25, 2012 || Haleakala || Pan-STARRS ||  || align=right | 4.7 km || 
|-id=381 bgcolor=#fefefe
| 579381 ||  || — || August 6, 2014 || Haleakala || Pan-STARRS ||  || align=right data-sort-value="0.94" | 940 m || 
|-id=382 bgcolor=#fefefe
| 579382 ||  || — || December 12, 2004 || Kitt Peak || Spacewatch ||  || align=right data-sort-value="0.70" | 700 m || 
|-id=383 bgcolor=#fefefe
| 579383 ||  || — || April 9, 2010 || Vail-Jarnac || Jarnac Obs. ||  || align=right data-sort-value="0.88" | 880 m || 
|-id=384 bgcolor=#fefefe
| 579384 ||  || — || October 23, 2003 || Apache Point || SDSS Collaboration ||  || align=right data-sort-value="0.68" | 680 m || 
|-id=385 bgcolor=#fefefe
| 579385 ||  || — || September 18, 2003 || Palomar || NEAT ||  || align=right data-sort-value="0.67" | 670 m || 
|-id=386 bgcolor=#fefefe
| 579386 ||  || — || October 11, 2007 || Kitt Peak || Spacewatch ||  || align=right data-sort-value="0.75" | 750 m || 
|-id=387 bgcolor=#fefefe
| 579387 ||  || — || August 6, 2014 || Haleakala || Pan-STARRS ||  || align=right data-sort-value="0.90" | 900 m || 
|-id=388 bgcolor=#fefefe
| 579388 ||  || — || March 9, 2005 || Mount Lemmon || Mount Lemmon Survey || V || align=right data-sort-value="0.53" | 530 m || 
|-id=389 bgcolor=#fefefe
| 579389 ||  || — || August 25, 2014 || Haleakala || Pan-STARRS ||  || align=right data-sort-value="0.78" | 780 m || 
|-id=390 bgcolor=#d6d6d6
| 579390 ||  || — || October 2, 2006 || Mount Lemmon || Mount Lemmon Survey || 3:2 || align=right | 4.0 km || 
|-id=391 bgcolor=#fefefe
| 579391 ||  || — || January 20, 2009 || Kitt Peak || Spacewatch ||  || align=right data-sort-value="0.82" | 820 m || 
|-id=392 bgcolor=#d6d6d6
| 579392 ||  || — || January 21, 2012 || Kitt Peak || Spacewatch ||  || align=right | 2.4 km || 
|-id=393 bgcolor=#fefefe
| 579393 ||  || — || October 26, 2011 || Haleakala || Pan-STARRS ||  || align=right data-sort-value="0.72" | 720 m || 
|-id=394 bgcolor=#E9E9E9
| 579394 ||  || — || September 18, 2010 || Mount Lemmon || Mount Lemmon Survey ||  || align=right | 1.6 km || 
|-id=395 bgcolor=#fefefe
| 579395 ||  || — || August 18, 2014 || Haleakala || Pan-STARRS ||  || align=right data-sort-value="0.66" | 660 m || 
|-id=396 bgcolor=#fefefe
| 579396 ||  || — || October 30, 2011 || Kitt Peak || Spacewatch ||  || align=right data-sort-value="0.73" | 730 m || 
|-id=397 bgcolor=#fefefe
| 579397 ||  || — || August 24, 2003 || Cerro Tololo || Cerro Tololo Obs. ||  || align=right data-sort-value="0.65" | 650 m || 
|-id=398 bgcolor=#fefefe
| 579398 ||  || — || March 15, 2013 || Kitt Peak || Spacewatch ||  || align=right data-sort-value="0.72" | 720 m || 
|-id=399 bgcolor=#fefefe
| 579399 ||  || — || September 10, 2007 || Kitt Peak || Spacewatch ||  || align=right data-sort-value="0.63" | 630 m || 
|-id=400 bgcolor=#fefefe
| 579400 ||  || — || November 4, 2007 || Kitt Peak || Spacewatch ||  || align=right data-sort-value="0.62" | 620 m || 
|}

579401–579500 

|-bgcolor=#fefefe
| 579401 ||  || — || December 22, 2008 || Kitt Peak || Spacewatch ||  || align=right data-sort-value="0.86" | 860 m || 
|-id=402 bgcolor=#fefefe
| 579402 ||  || — || August 23, 2014 || Haleakala || Pan-STARRS ||  || align=right data-sort-value="0.88" | 880 m || 
|-id=403 bgcolor=#E9E9E9
| 579403 ||  || — || August 31, 2014 || Haleakala || Pan-STARRS ||  || align=right | 1.1 km || 
|-id=404 bgcolor=#d6d6d6
| 579404 ||  || — || August 25, 2014 || Haleakala || Pan-STARRS ||  || align=right | 2.8 km || 
|-id=405 bgcolor=#E9E9E9
| 579405 ||  || — || August 25, 2014 || Haleakala || Pan-STARRS ||  || align=right data-sort-value="0.73" | 730 m || 
|-id=406 bgcolor=#fefefe
| 579406 ||  || — || August 25, 2014 || Haleakala || Pan-STARRS ||  || align=right data-sort-value="0.54" | 540 m || 
|-id=407 bgcolor=#d6d6d6
| 579407 ||  || — || August 20, 2014 || Haleakala || Pan-STARRS ||  || align=right | 1.7 km || 
|-id=408 bgcolor=#fefefe
| 579408 ||  || — || November 25, 2011 || Haleakala || Pan-STARRS ||  || align=right data-sort-value="0.58" | 580 m || 
|-id=409 bgcolor=#d6d6d6
| 579409 ||  || — || August 27, 2014 || Haleakala || Pan-STARRS ||  || align=right | 2.7 km || 
|-id=410 bgcolor=#fefefe
| 579410 ||  || — || July 30, 2014 || Haleakala || Pan-STARRS ||  || align=right data-sort-value="0.73" | 730 m || 
|-id=411 bgcolor=#fefefe
| 579411 ||  || — || September 14, 2007 || Mount Lemmon || Mount Lemmon Survey ||  || align=right data-sort-value="0.64" | 640 m || 
|-id=412 bgcolor=#fefefe
| 579412 ||  || — || July 8, 2014 || Haleakala || Pan-STARRS ||  || align=right data-sort-value="0.67" | 670 m || 
|-id=413 bgcolor=#fefefe
| 579413 ||  || — || November 11, 2004 || Kitt Peak || Spacewatch ||  || align=right data-sort-value="0.85" | 850 m || 
|-id=414 bgcolor=#d6d6d6
| 579414 ||  || — || August 25, 2014 || Haleakala || Pan-STARRS ||  || align=right | 2.4 km || 
|-id=415 bgcolor=#fefefe
| 579415 ||  || — || September 11, 2014 || Haleakala || Pan-STARRS || H || align=right data-sort-value="0.66" | 660 m || 
|-id=416 bgcolor=#fefefe
| 579416 ||  || — || July 29, 2014 || Haleakala || Pan-STARRS ||  || align=right data-sort-value="0.65" | 650 m || 
|-id=417 bgcolor=#fefefe
| 579417 ||  || — || April 24, 2003 || Kitt Peak || Spacewatch ||  || align=right data-sort-value="0.60" | 600 m || 
|-id=418 bgcolor=#E9E9E9
| 579418 ||  || — || August 27, 2014 || Haleakala || Pan-STARRS ||  || align=right | 1.3 km || 
|-id=419 bgcolor=#fefefe
| 579419 ||  || — || March 5, 2013 || Mount Lemmon || Mount Lemmon Survey ||  || align=right data-sort-value="0.67" | 670 m || 
|-id=420 bgcolor=#fefefe
| 579420 ||  || — || November 1, 2007 || Kitt Peak || Spacewatch ||  || align=right data-sort-value="0.61" | 610 m || 
|-id=421 bgcolor=#E9E9E9
| 579421 ||  || — || September 2, 2014 || Haleakala || Pan-STARRS ||  || align=right data-sort-value="0.77" | 770 m || 
|-id=422 bgcolor=#fefefe
| 579422 ||  || — || September 4, 2014 || Haleakala || Pan-STARRS ||  || align=right data-sort-value="0.71" | 710 m || 
|-id=423 bgcolor=#fefefe
| 579423 ||  || — || October 26, 2011 || Haleakala || Pan-STARRS ||  || align=right data-sort-value="0.65" | 650 m || 
|-id=424 bgcolor=#fefefe
| 579424 ||  || — || February 14, 2005 || Catalina || CSS ||  || align=right data-sort-value="0.70" | 700 m || 
|-id=425 bgcolor=#fefefe
| 579425 ||  || — || August 27, 2014 || Haleakala || Pan-STARRS ||  || align=right data-sort-value="0.62" | 620 m || 
|-id=426 bgcolor=#fefefe
| 579426 ||  || — || August 20, 2014 || Haleakala || Pan-STARRS ||  || align=right data-sort-value="0.61" | 610 m || 
|-id=427 bgcolor=#d6d6d6
| 579427 ||  || — || February 22, 2007 || Kitt Peak || Spacewatch ||  || align=right | 2.0 km || 
|-id=428 bgcolor=#fefefe
| 579428 ||  || — || April 19, 2006 || Kitt Peak || Spacewatch ||  || align=right data-sort-value="0.64" | 640 m || 
|-id=429 bgcolor=#fefefe
| 579429 ||  || — || February 28, 2009 || Kitt Peak || Spacewatch ||  || align=right data-sort-value="0.67" | 670 m || 
|-id=430 bgcolor=#fefefe
| 579430 ||  || — || March 17, 2013 || Palomar || PTF ||  || align=right data-sort-value="0.64" | 640 m || 
|-id=431 bgcolor=#fefefe
| 579431 ||  || — || October 25, 1995 || Kitt Peak || Spacewatch ||  || align=right | 1.00 km || 
|-id=432 bgcolor=#d6d6d6
| 579432 ||  || — || December 10, 2010 || Mount Lemmon || Mount Lemmon Survey ||  || align=right | 2.5 km || 
|-id=433 bgcolor=#fefefe
| 579433 ||  || — || February 2, 2005 || Kitt Peak || Spacewatch ||  || align=right data-sort-value="0.97" | 970 m || 
|-id=434 bgcolor=#d6d6d6
| 579434 ||  || — || August 28, 2014 || Haleakala || Pan-STARRS ||  || align=right | 2.1 km || 
|-id=435 bgcolor=#fefefe
| 579435 ||  || — || December 15, 2007 || Kitt Peak || Spacewatch ||  || align=right data-sort-value="0.68" | 680 m || 
|-id=436 bgcolor=#fefefe
| 579436 ||  || — || August 23, 2014 || Haleakala || Pan-STARRS ||  || align=right data-sort-value="0.57" | 570 m || 
|-id=437 bgcolor=#fefefe
| 579437 ||  || — || October 24, 2011 || Haleakala || Pan-STARRS ||  || align=right data-sort-value="0.59" | 590 m || 
|-id=438 bgcolor=#fefefe
| 579438 ||  || — || December 20, 2004 || Mount Lemmon || Mount Lemmon Survey ||  || align=right data-sort-value="0.91" | 910 m || 
|-id=439 bgcolor=#fefefe
| 579439 ||  || — || December 21, 2008 || Kitt Peak || Spacewatch ||  || align=right data-sort-value="0.81" | 810 m || 
|-id=440 bgcolor=#fefefe
| 579440 ||  || — || October 18, 2007 || Kitt Peak || Spacewatch ||  || align=right data-sort-value="0.90" | 900 m || 
|-id=441 bgcolor=#d6d6d6
| 579441 ||  || — || July 29, 2014 || Haleakala || Pan-STARRS ||  || align=right | 2.4 km || 
|-id=442 bgcolor=#fefefe
| 579442 ||  || — || September 18, 2014 || Haleakala || Pan-STARRS ||  || align=right data-sort-value="0.61" | 610 m || 
|-id=443 bgcolor=#fefefe
| 579443 ||  || — || October 8, 2007 || Mount Lemmon || Mount Lemmon Survey ||  || align=right data-sort-value="0.65" | 650 m || 
|-id=444 bgcolor=#fefefe
| 579444 ||  || — || March 8, 2013 || Haleakala || Pan-STARRS ||  || align=right data-sort-value="0.54" | 540 m || 
|-id=445 bgcolor=#fefefe
| 579445 ||  || — || January 1, 2008 || Kitt Peak || Spacewatch ||  || align=right data-sort-value="0.51" | 510 m || 
|-id=446 bgcolor=#fefefe
| 579446 ||  || — || November 18, 2008 || Kitt Peak || Spacewatch ||  || align=right data-sort-value="0.61" | 610 m || 
|-id=447 bgcolor=#fefefe
| 579447 ||  || — || October 2, 2003 || Kitt Peak || Spacewatch ||  || align=right data-sort-value="0.63" | 630 m || 
|-id=448 bgcolor=#fefefe
| 579448 ||  || — || April 1, 2009 || Mount Lemmon || Mount Lemmon Survey ||  || align=right data-sort-value="0.64" | 640 m || 
|-id=449 bgcolor=#fefefe
| 579449 ||  || — || February 2, 2009 || Kitt Peak || Spacewatch ||  || align=right data-sort-value="0.68" | 680 m || 
|-id=450 bgcolor=#fefefe
| 579450 ||  || — || October 10, 2007 || Mount Lemmon || Mount Lemmon Survey ||  || align=right data-sort-value="0.60" | 600 m || 
|-id=451 bgcolor=#fefefe
| 579451 ||  || — || March 18, 2009 || Kitt Peak || Spacewatch ||  || align=right data-sort-value="0.67" | 670 m || 
|-id=452 bgcolor=#d6d6d6
| 579452 ||  || — || September 18, 2006 || Catalina || CSS || SHU3:2 || align=right | 6.1 km || 
|-id=453 bgcolor=#fefefe
| 579453 ||  || — || September 19, 2014 || Haleakala || Pan-STARRS ||  || align=right data-sort-value="0.76" | 760 m || 
|-id=454 bgcolor=#fefefe
| 579454 ||  || — || February 4, 2012 || Haleakala || Pan-STARRS ||  || align=right data-sort-value="0.77" | 770 m || 
|-id=455 bgcolor=#E9E9E9
| 579455 ||  || — || September 28, 2006 || Kitt Peak || Spacewatch ||  || align=right data-sort-value="0.75" | 750 m || 
|-id=456 bgcolor=#d6d6d6
| 579456 ||  || — || February 28, 2012 || Haleakala || Pan-STARRS ||  || align=right | 2.8 km || 
|-id=457 bgcolor=#fefefe
| 579457 ||  || — || September 20, 2014 || Haleakala || Pan-STARRS ||  || align=right data-sort-value="0.68" | 680 m || 
|-id=458 bgcolor=#d6d6d6
| 579458 ||  || — || August 27, 2014 || Haleakala || Pan-STARRS ||  || align=right | 2.0 km || 
|-id=459 bgcolor=#fefefe
| 579459 ||  || — || May 13, 2009 || Kitt Peak || Spacewatch ||  || align=right data-sort-value="0.83" | 830 m || 
|-id=460 bgcolor=#fefefe
| 579460 ||  || — || September 20, 2014 || Haleakala || Pan-STARRS ||  || align=right data-sort-value="0.74" | 740 m || 
|-id=461 bgcolor=#fefefe
| 579461 ||  || — || September 11, 2010 || Kitt Peak || Spacewatch ||  || align=right data-sort-value="0.68" | 680 m || 
|-id=462 bgcolor=#E9E9E9
| 579462 ||  || — || December 17, 2001 || Socorro || LINEAR ||  || align=right | 1.2 km || 
|-id=463 bgcolor=#fefefe
| 579463 ||  || — || August 31, 2014 || Haleakala || Pan-STARRS ||  || align=right data-sort-value="0.73" | 730 m || 
|-id=464 bgcolor=#fefefe
| 579464 ||  || — || March 3, 2009 || Kitt Peak || Spacewatch ||  || align=right | 1.00 km || 
|-id=465 bgcolor=#d6d6d6
| 579465 ||  || — || April 2, 2005 || Mount Lemmon || Mount Lemmon Survey ||  || align=right | 3.1 km || 
|-id=466 bgcolor=#fefefe
| 579466 ||  || — || October 20, 2003 || Socorro || LINEAR ||  || align=right data-sort-value="0.79" | 790 m || 
|-id=467 bgcolor=#E9E9E9
| 579467 ||  || — || March 15, 2004 || Kitt Peak || Spacewatch ||  || align=right | 1.1 km || 
|-id=468 bgcolor=#fefefe
| 579468 ||  || — || July 24, 2003 || Palomar || NEAT ||  || align=right data-sort-value="0.90" | 900 m || 
|-id=469 bgcolor=#E9E9E9
| 579469 ||  || — || October 12, 2010 || Kitt Peak || Spacewatch ||  || align=right | 1.3 km || 
|-id=470 bgcolor=#fefefe
| 579470 ||  || — || January 25, 2009 || Kitt Peak || Spacewatch ||  || align=right data-sort-value="0.62" | 620 m || 
|-id=471 bgcolor=#fefefe
| 579471 ||  || — || January 31, 2009 || Kitt Peak || Spacewatch ||  || align=right data-sort-value="0.72" | 720 m || 
|-id=472 bgcolor=#fefefe
| 579472 ||  || — || September 19, 2014 || Haleakala || Pan-STARRS ||  || align=right data-sort-value="0.72" | 720 m || 
|-id=473 bgcolor=#fefefe
| 579473 ||  || — || August 23, 2003 || Palomar || NEAT ||  || align=right data-sort-value="0.76" | 760 m || 
|-id=474 bgcolor=#fefefe
| 579474 ||  || — || August 29, 2006 || Kitt Peak || Spacewatch ||  || align=right | 1.0 km || 
|-id=475 bgcolor=#fefefe
| 579475 ||  || — || September 19, 2014 || Haleakala || Pan-STARRS ||  || align=right data-sort-value="0.60" | 600 m || 
|-id=476 bgcolor=#fefefe
| 579476 ||  || — || September 21, 2003 || Haleakala || AMOS ||  || align=right data-sort-value="0.59" | 590 m || 
|-id=477 bgcolor=#fefefe
| 579477 ||  || — || July 18, 2002 || Palomar || NEAT ||  || align=right | 1.0 km || 
|-id=478 bgcolor=#d6d6d6
| 579478 ||  || — || February 8, 2002 || Kitt Peak || R. Millis, M. W. Buie || SHU3:2 || align=right | 4.6 km || 
|-id=479 bgcolor=#fefefe
| 579479 ||  || — || November 3, 2011 || Mount Lemmon || Mount Lemmon Survey ||  || align=right data-sort-value="0.66" | 660 m || 
|-id=480 bgcolor=#d6d6d6
| 579480 ||  || — || October 25, 2009 || Kitt Peak || Spacewatch ||  || align=right | 1.9 km || 
|-id=481 bgcolor=#fefefe
| 579481 ||  || — || October 24, 2011 || Haleakala || Pan-STARRS ||  || align=right data-sort-value="0.62" | 620 m || 
|-id=482 bgcolor=#d6d6d6
| 579482 ||  || — || September 25, 2009 || Kitt Peak || Spacewatch ||  || align=right | 1.7 km || 
|-id=483 bgcolor=#fefefe
| 579483 ||  || — || October 17, 2007 || Mount Lemmon || Mount Lemmon Survey ||  || align=right data-sort-value="0.90" | 900 m || 
|-id=484 bgcolor=#d6d6d6
| 579484 ||  || — || April 19, 2012 || Kitt Peak || Spacewatch ||  || align=right | 3.0 km || 
|-id=485 bgcolor=#fefefe
| 579485 ||  || — || September 12, 2007 || Catalina || CSS ||  || align=right data-sort-value="0.71" | 710 m || 
|-id=486 bgcolor=#fefefe
| 579486 ||  || — || March 16, 2013 || Kitt Peak || Spacewatch ||  || align=right data-sort-value="0.71" | 710 m || 
|-id=487 bgcolor=#fefefe
| 579487 ||  || — || September 2, 2014 || Haleakala || Pan-STARRS ||  || align=right data-sort-value="0.98" | 980 m || 
|-id=488 bgcolor=#fefefe
| 579488 ||  || — || October 13, 2010 || Mount Lemmon || Mount Lemmon Survey ||  || align=right data-sort-value="0.74" | 740 m || 
|-id=489 bgcolor=#fefefe
| 579489 ||  || — || October 29, 2003 || Kitt Peak || Spacewatch ||  || align=right data-sort-value="0.82" | 820 m || 
|-id=490 bgcolor=#fefefe
| 579490 ||  || — || May 3, 2006 || Mount Lemmon || Mount Lemmon Survey ||  || align=right data-sort-value="0.79" | 790 m || 
|-id=491 bgcolor=#fefefe
| 579491 ||  || — || November 2, 2007 || Kitt Peak || Spacewatch ||  || align=right data-sort-value="0.59" | 590 m || 
|-id=492 bgcolor=#fefefe
| 579492 ||  || — || November 26, 2011 || Mount Lemmon || Mount Lemmon Survey ||  || align=right data-sort-value="0.73" | 730 m || 
|-id=493 bgcolor=#fefefe
| 579493 ||  || — || December 19, 2007 || Mount Lemmon || Mount Lemmon Survey ||  || align=right data-sort-value="0.82" | 820 m || 
|-id=494 bgcolor=#E9E9E9
| 579494 ||  || — || October 16, 2001 || Kitt Peak || Spacewatch || JUN || align=right data-sort-value="0.95" | 950 m || 
|-id=495 bgcolor=#fefefe
| 579495 ||  || — || August 25, 2003 || Cerro Tololo || Cerro Tololo Obs. ||  || align=right data-sort-value="0.64" | 640 m || 
|-id=496 bgcolor=#fefefe
| 579496 ||  || — || September 19, 2014 || Haleakala || Pan-STARRS ||  || align=right data-sort-value="0.66" | 660 m || 
|-id=497 bgcolor=#fefefe
| 579497 ||  || — || September 18, 2003 || Palomar || NEAT ||  || align=right data-sort-value="0.69" | 690 m || 
|-id=498 bgcolor=#fefefe
| 579498 ||  || — || August 29, 2014 || Mount Lemmon || Mount Lemmon Survey ||  || align=right data-sort-value="0.89" | 890 m || 
|-id=499 bgcolor=#C2FFFF
| 579499 ||  || — || March 31, 2009 || Kitt Peak || Spacewatch || L5 || align=right | 9.7 km || 
|-id=500 bgcolor=#fefefe
| 579500 ||  || — || August 31, 2010 || ESA OGS || ESA OGS ||  || align=right data-sort-value="0.69" | 690 m || 
|}

579501–579600 

|-bgcolor=#fefefe
| 579501 ||  || — || October 20, 2003 || Kitt Peak || Spacewatch ||  || align=right data-sort-value="0.64" | 640 m || 
|-id=502 bgcolor=#fefefe
| 579502 ||  || — || February 3, 2008 || Mount Lemmon || Mount Lemmon Survey ||  || align=right data-sort-value="0.64" | 640 m || 
|-id=503 bgcolor=#fefefe
| 579503 ||  || — || September 19, 2014 || Haleakala || Pan-STARRS ||  || align=right data-sort-value="0.71" | 710 m || 
|-id=504 bgcolor=#fefefe
| 579504 ||  || — || November 4, 2004 || Kitt Peak || Spacewatch ||  || align=right data-sort-value="0.59" | 590 m || 
|-id=505 bgcolor=#fefefe
| 579505 ||  || — || July 7, 2010 || Kitt Peak || Spacewatch ||  || align=right data-sort-value="0.63" | 630 m || 
|-id=506 bgcolor=#d6d6d6
| 579506 ||  || — || August 20, 2014 || Haleakala || Pan-STARRS ||  || align=right | 3.2 km || 
|-id=507 bgcolor=#fefefe
| 579507 ||  || — || November 21, 2007 || Mount Lemmon || Mount Lemmon Survey ||  || align=right data-sort-value="0.62" | 620 m || 
|-id=508 bgcolor=#fefefe
| 579508 ||  || — || October 16, 2007 || Mount Lemmon || Mount Lemmon Survey ||  || align=right data-sort-value="0.67" | 670 m || 
|-id=509 bgcolor=#E9E9E9
| 579509 ||  || — || February 27, 2012 || Catalina || CSS ||  || align=right | 1.8 km || 
|-id=510 bgcolor=#d6d6d6
| 579510 ||  || — || September 29, 2014 || Kitt Peak || Spacewatch ||  || align=right | 2.7 km || 
|-id=511 bgcolor=#fefefe
| 579511 ||  || — || March 15, 2013 || Mount Lemmon || Mount Lemmon Survey ||  || align=right data-sort-value="0.77" | 770 m || 
|-id=512 bgcolor=#fefefe
| 579512 ||  || — || November 20, 2003 || Kitt Peak || Spacewatch ||  || align=right data-sort-value="0.65" | 650 m || 
|-id=513 bgcolor=#E9E9E9
| 579513 Saselemér ||  ||  || November 1, 2010 || Piszkesteto || K. Sárneczky, Z. Kuli ||  || align=right data-sort-value="0.68" | 680 m || 
|-id=514 bgcolor=#fefefe
| 579514 ||  || — || March 3, 2009 || Kitt Peak || Spacewatch ||  || align=right data-sort-value="0.67" | 670 m || 
|-id=515 bgcolor=#fefefe
| 579515 ||  || — || December 31, 2011 || Kitt Peak || Spacewatch ||  || align=right data-sort-value="0.57" | 570 m || 
|-id=516 bgcolor=#E9E9E9
| 579516 ||  || — || September 24, 2014 || Mount Lemmon || Mount Lemmon Survey ||  || align=right | 2.0 km || 
|-id=517 bgcolor=#E9E9E9
| 579517 ||  || — || September 30, 2014 || Kitt Peak || Spacewatch ||  || align=right | 1.3 km || 
|-id=518 bgcolor=#E9E9E9
| 579518 ||  || — || September 24, 2014 || ESA OGS || ESA OGS ||  || align=right data-sort-value="0.94" | 940 m || 
|-id=519 bgcolor=#fefefe
| 579519 ||  || — || September 9, 2007 || Kitt Peak || Spacewatch ||  || align=right data-sort-value="0.48" | 480 m || 
|-id=520 bgcolor=#d6d6d6
| 579520 ||  || — || September 20, 2014 || Haleakala || Pan-STARRS ||  || align=right | 2.2 km || 
|-id=521 bgcolor=#E9E9E9
| 579521 ||  || — || October 30, 2010 || Mount Lemmon || Mount Lemmon Survey ||  || align=right data-sort-value="0.86" | 860 m || 
|-id=522 bgcolor=#fefefe
| 579522 ||  || — || October 2, 2003 || Kitt Peak || Spacewatch ||  || align=right data-sort-value="0.63" | 630 m || 
|-id=523 bgcolor=#fefefe
| 579523 ||  || — || September 14, 2007 || Mount Lemmon || Mount Lemmon Survey ||  || align=right data-sort-value="0.59" | 590 m || 
|-id=524 bgcolor=#fefefe
| 579524 ||  || — || September 23, 2014 || Kitt Peak || Spacewatch ||  || align=right data-sort-value="0.70" | 700 m || 
|-id=525 bgcolor=#E9E9E9
| 579525 ||  || — || September 23, 2014 || Mount Lemmon || Mount Lemmon Survey ||  || align=right | 1.2 km || 
|-id=526 bgcolor=#d6d6d6
| 579526 ||  || — || July 1, 2013 || Haleakala || Pan-STARRS || 3:2 || align=right | 3.1 km || 
|-id=527 bgcolor=#fefefe
| 579527 ||  || — || October 1, 2014 || Mount Lemmon || Mount Lemmon Survey ||  || align=right data-sort-value="0.71" | 710 m || 
|-id=528 bgcolor=#fefefe
| 579528 ||  || — || May 17, 2009 || Mount Lemmon || Mount Lemmon Survey ||  || align=right data-sort-value="0.80" | 800 m || 
|-id=529 bgcolor=#fefefe
| 579529 ||  || — || September 19, 2014 || Haleakala || Pan-STARRS ||  || align=right data-sort-value="0.74" | 740 m || 
|-id=530 bgcolor=#fefefe
| 579530 ||  || — || December 21, 2003 || Kitt Peak || Spacewatch ||  || align=right data-sort-value="0.57" | 570 m || 
|-id=531 bgcolor=#E9E9E9
| 579531 ||  || — || November 2, 2010 || Mount Lemmon || Mount Lemmon Survey ||  || align=right data-sort-value="0.78" | 780 m || 
|-id=532 bgcolor=#E9E9E9
| 579532 ||  || — || February 10, 2008 || Kitt Peak || Spacewatch ||  || align=right data-sort-value="0.87" | 870 m || 
|-id=533 bgcolor=#E9E9E9
| 579533 ||  || — || September 2, 2014 || Haleakala || Pan-STARRS ||  || align=right data-sort-value="0.79" | 790 m || 
|-id=534 bgcolor=#E9E9E9
| 579534 ||  || — || December 4, 2010 || Piszkesteto || Z. Kuli, K. Sárneczky ||  || align=right | 1.6 km || 
|-id=535 bgcolor=#fefefe
| 579535 ||  || — || January 2, 2012 || Mount Lemmon || Mount Lemmon Survey ||  || align=right data-sort-value="0.78" | 780 m || 
|-id=536 bgcolor=#fefefe
| 579536 ||  || — || March 13, 2013 || Kitt Peak || Spacewatch ||  || align=right data-sort-value="0.79" | 790 m || 
|-id=537 bgcolor=#E9E9E9
| 579537 ||  || — || March 6, 2008 || Mount Lemmon || Mount Lemmon Survey ||  || align=right data-sort-value="0.98" | 980 m || 
|-id=538 bgcolor=#fefefe
| 579538 ||  || — || July 29, 2006 || Reedy Creek || J. Broughton ||  || align=right data-sort-value="0.89" | 890 m || 
|-id=539 bgcolor=#fefefe
| 579539 ||  || — || October 20, 2003 || Kitt Peak || Spacewatch ||  || align=right data-sort-value="0.85" | 850 m || 
|-id=540 bgcolor=#fefefe
| 579540 ||  || — || February 28, 2012 || Haleakala || Pan-STARRS ||  || align=right data-sort-value="0.67" | 670 m || 
|-id=541 bgcolor=#fefefe
| 579541 ||  || — || October 13, 2014 || Mount Lemmon || Mount Lemmon Survey ||  || align=right data-sort-value="0.68" | 680 m || 
|-id=542 bgcolor=#E9E9E9
| 579542 ||  || — || October 3, 2014 || Kitt Peak || Spacewatch ||  || align=right | 1.3 km || 
|-id=543 bgcolor=#fefefe
| 579543 ||  || — || October 14, 2014 || Mount Lemmon || Mount Lemmon Survey ||  || align=right data-sort-value="0.63" | 630 m || 
|-id=544 bgcolor=#fefefe
| 579544 ||  || — || February 19, 2012 || Kitt Peak || Spacewatch ||  || align=right data-sort-value="0.85" | 850 m || 
|-id=545 bgcolor=#E9E9E9
| 579545 ||  || — || October 14, 2014 || Kitt Peak || Spacewatch ||  || align=right | 1.1 km || 
|-id=546 bgcolor=#fefefe
| 579546 ||  || — || September 25, 2003 || Palomar || NEAT ||  || align=right data-sort-value="0.68" | 680 m || 
|-id=547 bgcolor=#E9E9E9
| 579547 ||  || — || April 27, 2012 || Haleakala || Pan-STARRS ||  || align=right | 1.0 km || 
|-id=548 bgcolor=#fefefe
| 579548 ||  || — || November 18, 2007 || Mount Lemmon || Mount Lemmon Survey ||  || align=right data-sort-value="0.76" | 760 m || 
|-id=549 bgcolor=#fefefe
| 579549 ||  || — || October 29, 1999 || Kitt Peak || Spacewatch ||  || align=right data-sort-value="0.64" | 640 m || 
|-id=550 bgcolor=#d6d6d6
| 579550 ||  || — || September 19, 2014 || Haleakala || Pan-STARRS ||  || align=right | 2.5 km || 
|-id=551 bgcolor=#fefefe
| 579551 ||  || — || November 20, 2003 || Kitt Peak || Spacewatch ||  || align=right data-sort-value="0.69" | 690 m || 
|-id=552 bgcolor=#fefefe
| 579552 ||  || — || October 1, 2014 || Haleakala || Pan-STARRS ||  || align=right data-sort-value="0.87" | 870 m || 
|-id=553 bgcolor=#fefefe
| 579553 ||  || — || October 11, 2007 || Kitt Peak || Spacewatch ||  || align=right data-sort-value="0.57" | 570 m || 
|-id=554 bgcolor=#E9E9E9
| 579554 ||  || — || October 3, 2014 || Haleakala || Pan-STARRS ||  || align=right | 1.0 km || 
|-id=555 bgcolor=#fefefe
| 579555 ||  || — || October 2, 2014 || Haleakala || Pan-STARRS ||  || align=right data-sort-value="0.74" | 740 m || 
|-id=556 bgcolor=#fefefe
| 579556 ||  || — || October 3, 2014 || Mount Lemmon || Mount Lemmon Survey ||  || align=right data-sort-value="0.65" | 650 m || 
|-id=557 bgcolor=#fefefe
| 579557 ||  || — || October 1, 2014 || Haleakala || Pan-STARRS ||  || align=right data-sort-value="0.60" | 600 m || 
|-id=558 bgcolor=#E9E9E9
| 579558 ||  || — || March 23, 2012 || Mount Lemmon || Mount Lemmon Survey ||  || align=right data-sort-value="0.71" | 710 m || 
|-id=559 bgcolor=#E9E9E9
| 579559 ||  || — || October 5, 2014 || Mount Lemmon || Mount Lemmon Survey ||  || align=right data-sort-value="0.82" | 820 m || 
|-id=560 bgcolor=#C2FFFF
| 579560 ||  || — || October 3, 2014 || Mount Lemmon || Mount Lemmon Survey || L5 || align=right | 9.5 km || 
|-id=561 bgcolor=#E9E9E9
| 579561 ||  || — || October 4, 2014 || Haleakala || Pan-STARRS ||  || align=right | 1.6 km || 
|-id=562 bgcolor=#C2FFFF
| 579562 ||  || — || October 5, 2014 || Mount Lemmon || Mount Lemmon Survey || L5 || align=right | 6.9 km || 
|-id=563 bgcolor=#fefefe
| 579563 ||  || — || October 1, 2014 || Haleakala || Pan-STARRS ||  || align=right data-sort-value="0.72" | 720 m || 
|-id=564 bgcolor=#E9E9E9
| 579564 ||  || — || August 29, 2014 || Mount Lemmon || Mount Lemmon Survey ||  || align=right | 1.5 km || 
|-id=565 bgcolor=#fefefe
| 579565 ||  || — || January 1, 2008 || Kitt Peak || Spacewatch ||  || align=right data-sort-value="0.70" | 700 m || 
|-id=566 bgcolor=#E9E9E9
| 579566 ||  || — || October 1, 2014 || Haleakala || Pan-STARRS ||  || align=right | 1.4 km || 
|-id=567 bgcolor=#fefefe
| 579567 ||  || — || February 23, 2012 || Mount Lemmon || Mount Lemmon Survey ||  || align=right data-sort-value="0.64" | 640 m || 
|-id=568 bgcolor=#fefefe
| 579568 ||  || — || December 4, 2007 || Mount Lemmon || Mount Lemmon Survey ||  || align=right | 1.0 km || 
|-id=569 bgcolor=#d6d6d6
| 579569 ||  || — || October 17, 2014 || Mount Lemmon || Mount Lemmon Survey ||  || align=right | 2.1 km || 
|-id=570 bgcolor=#fefefe
| 579570 ||  || — || November 15, 2003 || Kitt Peak || Spacewatch ||  || align=right data-sort-value="0.79" | 790 m || 
|-id=571 bgcolor=#E9E9E9
| 579571 ||  || — || September 2, 2014 || Haleakala || Pan-STARRS ||  || align=right | 1.2 km || 
|-id=572 bgcolor=#fefefe
| 579572 ||  || — || September 17, 2010 || Mount Lemmon || Mount Lemmon Survey ||  || align=right data-sort-value="0.76" | 760 m || 
|-id=573 bgcolor=#FA8072
| 579573 ||  || — || December 6, 2007 || Catalina || CSS ||  || align=right data-sort-value="0.75" | 750 m || 
|-id=574 bgcolor=#E9E9E9
| 579574 ||  || — || November 12, 2010 || Mount Lemmon || Mount Lemmon Survey ||  || align=right | 1.0 km || 
|-id=575 bgcolor=#fefefe
| 579575 ||  || — || November 18, 2007 || Mount Lemmon || Mount Lemmon Survey ||  || align=right data-sort-value="0.65" | 650 m || 
|-id=576 bgcolor=#fefefe
| 579576 ||  || — || May 17, 2009 || Mount Lemmon || Mount Lemmon Survey ||  || align=right data-sort-value="0.75" | 750 m || 
|-id=577 bgcolor=#fefefe
| 579577 ||  || — || September 5, 1996 || Lime Creek || B. Linderholm ||  || align=right | 1.1 km || 
|-id=578 bgcolor=#fefefe
| 579578 ||  || — || October 22, 2014 || Mount Lemmon || Mount Lemmon Survey ||  || align=right data-sort-value="0.60" | 600 m || 
|-id=579 bgcolor=#fefefe
| 579579 ||  || — || October 23, 2014 || Kitt Peak || Spacewatch ||  || align=right data-sort-value="0.49" | 490 m || 
|-id=580 bgcolor=#fefefe
| 579580 ||  || — || December 29, 2011 || Kitt Peak || Spacewatch ||  || align=right data-sort-value="0.76" | 760 m || 
|-id=581 bgcolor=#fefefe
| 579581 ||  || — || October 10, 2007 || Mount Lemmon || Mount Lemmon Survey ||  || align=right data-sort-value="0.70" | 700 m || 
|-id=582 bgcolor=#fefefe
| 579582 ||  || — || March 19, 2009 || Mount Lemmon || Mount Lemmon Survey ||  || align=right data-sort-value="0.80" | 800 m || 
|-id=583 bgcolor=#d6d6d6
| 579583 ||  || — || September 15, 2006 || Kitt Peak || Spacewatch || 3:2 || align=right | 3.2 km || 
|-id=584 bgcolor=#fefefe
| 579584 ||  || — || September 25, 2014 || Kitt Peak || Spacewatch ||  || align=right data-sort-value="0.81" | 810 m || 
|-id=585 bgcolor=#fefefe
| 579585 ||  || — || October 21, 2014 || Mount Lemmon || Mount Lemmon Survey ||  || align=right data-sort-value="0.80" | 800 m || 
|-id=586 bgcolor=#E9E9E9
| 579586 ||  || — || October 25, 2001 || Apache Point || SDSS Collaboration ||  || align=right | 1.3 km || 
|-id=587 bgcolor=#fefefe
| 579587 ||  || — || January 11, 2008 || Kitt Peak || Spacewatch ||  || align=right data-sort-value="0.75" | 750 m || 
|-id=588 bgcolor=#C2FFFF
| 579588 ||  || — || September 6, 2013 || Kitt Peak || Spacewatch || L5 || align=right | 8.4 km || 
|-id=589 bgcolor=#d6d6d6
| 579589 ||  || — || October 23, 2014 || Kitt Peak || Spacewatch ||  || align=right | 2.9 km || 
|-id=590 bgcolor=#fefefe
| 579590 ||  || — || August 31, 2014 || Haleakala || Pan-STARRS ||  || align=right data-sort-value="0.66" | 660 m || 
|-id=591 bgcolor=#C2FFFF
| 579591 ||  || — || October 15, 2014 || Kitt Peak || Spacewatch || L5 || align=right | 8.8 km || 
|-id=592 bgcolor=#fefefe
| 579592 ||  || — || August 22, 2003 || Palomar || NEAT ||  || align=right data-sort-value="0.67" | 670 m || 
|-id=593 bgcolor=#fefefe
| 579593 ||  || — || February 11, 2008 || Mount Lemmon || Mount Lemmon Survey ||  || align=right data-sort-value="0.78" | 780 m || 
|-id=594 bgcolor=#d6d6d6
| 579594 ||  || — || May 13, 2012 || Mount Lemmon || Mount Lemmon Survey || 3:2 || align=right | 4.4 km || 
|-id=595 bgcolor=#d6d6d6
| 579595 ||  || — || February 27, 2012 || Haleakala || Pan-STARRS ||  || align=right | 2.3 km || 
|-id=596 bgcolor=#fefefe
| 579596 ||  || — || January 25, 2009 || Kitt Peak || Spacewatch ||  || align=right data-sort-value="0.71" | 710 m || 
|-id=597 bgcolor=#E9E9E9
| 579597 ||  || — || March 15, 2004 || Kitt Peak || Spacewatch ||  || align=right data-sort-value="0.90" | 900 m || 
|-id=598 bgcolor=#E9E9E9
| 579598 ||  || — || November 28, 2005 || Kitt Peak || Spacewatch ||  || align=right | 1.5 km || 
|-id=599 bgcolor=#fefefe
| 579599 ||  || — || September 11, 2010 || Catalina || CSS ||  || align=right data-sort-value="0.70" | 700 m || 
|-id=600 bgcolor=#d6d6d6
| 579600 ||  || — || July 15, 2005 || Kitt Peak || Spacewatch || 3:2 || align=right | 3.2 km || 
|}

579601–579700 

|-bgcolor=#fefefe
| 579601 ||  || — || September 26, 2014 || Kitt Peak || Spacewatch ||  || align=right data-sort-value="0.60" | 600 m || 
|-id=602 bgcolor=#fefefe
| 579602 ||  || — || May 10, 2005 || Mount Lemmon || Mount Lemmon Survey ||  || align=right data-sort-value="0.85" | 850 m || 
|-id=603 bgcolor=#E9E9E9
| 579603 ||  || — || April 3, 2008 || Kitt Peak || Spacewatch ||  || align=right | 1.5 km || 
|-id=604 bgcolor=#fefefe
| 579604 ||  || — || October 21, 2003 || Kitt Peak || Spacewatch ||  || align=right data-sort-value="0.86" | 860 m || 
|-id=605 bgcolor=#fefefe
| 579605 ||  || — || October 25, 2014 || Haleakala || Pan-STARRS ||  || align=right data-sort-value="0.67" | 670 m || 
|-id=606 bgcolor=#E9E9E9
| 579606 ||  || — || October 25, 2014 || Haleakala || Pan-STARRS ||  || align=right | 1.3 km || 
|-id=607 bgcolor=#E9E9E9
| 579607 ||  || — || March 26, 2008 || Mount Lemmon || Mount Lemmon Survey ||  || align=right | 1.2 km || 
|-id=608 bgcolor=#C2FFFF
| 579608 ||  || — || March 29, 2008 || Kitt Peak || Spacewatch || L5 || align=right | 8.4 km || 
|-id=609 bgcolor=#fefefe
| 579609 ||  || — || August 29, 2006 || Kitt Peak || Spacewatch ||  || align=right data-sort-value="0.67" | 670 m || 
|-id=610 bgcolor=#E9E9E9
| 579610 ||  || — || December 14, 2010 || Mount Lemmon || Mount Lemmon Survey ||  || align=right | 1.3 km || 
|-id=611 bgcolor=#fefefe
| 579611 ||  || — || March 11, 2008 || Mount Lemmon || Mount Lemmon Survey ||  || align=right data-sort-value="0.67" | 670 m || 
|-id=612 bgcolor=#fefefe
| 579612 ||  || — || September 28, 2003 || Anderson Mesa || LONEOS ||  || align=right data-sort-value="0.72" | 720 m || 
|-id=613 bgcolor=#E9E9E9
| 579613 ||  || — || October 28, 2014 || Mount Lemmon || Mount Lemmon Survey ||  || align=right data-sort-value="0.93" | 930 m || 
|-id=614 bgcolor=#fefefe
| 579614 ||  || — || April 17, 2005 || Kitt Peak || Spacewatch ||  || align=right data-sort-value="0.83" | 830 m || 
|-id=615 bgcolor=#E9E9E9
| 579615 ||  || — || April 4, 2008 || Kitt Peak || Spacewatch ||  || align=right | 1.2 km || 
|-id=616 bgcolor=#fefefe
| 579616 ||  || — || October 11, 2007 || Kitt Peak || Spacewatch ||  || align=right data-sort-value="0.69" | 690 m || 
|-id=617 bgcolor=#d6d6d6
| 579617 ||  || — || October 3, 2006 || Mount Lemmon || Mount Lemmon Survey || 3:2 || align=right | 4.1 km || 
|-id=618 bgcolor=#fefefe
| 579618 ||  || — || December 6, 2007 || Charleston || R. Holmes || NYS || align=right data-sort-value="0.63" | 630 m || 
|-id=619 bgcolor=#d6d6d6
| 579619 ||  || — || September 28, 2006 || Kitt Peak || Spacewatch || 3:2 || align=right | 4.0 km || 
|-id=620 bgcolor=#fefefe
| 579620 ||  || — || August 25, 2014 || Haleakala || Pan-STARRS ||  || align=right data-sort-value="0.66" | 660 m || 
|-id=621 bgcolor=#fefefe
| 579621 ||  || — || January 17, 2008 || Mount Lemmon || Mount Lemmon Survey ||  || align=right data-sort-value="0.92" | 920 m || 
|-id=622 bgcolor=#fefefe
| 579622 ||  || — || May 8, 2013 || Haleakala || Pan-STARRS ||  || align=right data-sort-value="0.81" | 810 m || 
|-id=623 bgcolor=#fefefe
| 579623 ||  || — || October 3, 2010 || Piszkesteto || Z. Kuli, K. Sárneczky ||  || align=right data-sort-value="0.77" | 770 m || 
|-id=624 bgcolor=#fefefe
| 579624 ||  || — || November 30, 2000 || Kitt Peak || Spacewatch ||  || align=right data-sort-value="0.98" | 980 m || 
|-id=625 bgcolor=#fefefe
| 579625 ||  || — || September 27, 2003 || Kitt Peak || Spacewatch || MAS || align=right data-sort-value="0.72" | 720 m || 
|-id=626 bgcolor=#fefefe
| 579626 ||  || — || October 3, 2014 || Mount Lemmon || Mount Lemmon Survey ||  || align=right data-sort-value="0.66" | 660 m || 
|-id=627 bgcolor=#E9E9E9
| 579627 ||  || — || October 16, 2006 || Kitt Peak || Spacewatch ||  || align=right data-sort-value="0.67" | 670 m || 
|-id=628 bgcolor=#fefefe
| 579628 ||  || — || January 18, 2004 || Palomar || NEAT ||  || align=right data-sort-value="0.91" | 910 m || 
|-id=629 bgcolor=#FA8072
| 579629 ||  || — || May 26, 2006 || Mount Lemmon || Mount Lemmon Survey ||  || align=right | 1.6 km || 
|-id=630 bgcolor=#fefefe
| 579630 ||  || — || August 28, 2014 || Haleakala || Pan-STARRS ||  || align=right data-sort-value="0.79" | 790 m || 
|-id=631 bgcolor=#d6d6d6
| 579631 ||  || — || June 12, 2013 || Oukaimeden || M. Ory || 3:2 || align=right | 4.0 km || 
|-id=632 bgcolor=#E9E9E9
| 579632 ||  || — || October 30, 2010 || Kitt Peak || Spacewatch ||  || align=right data-sort-value="0.93" | 930 m || 
|-id=633 bgcolor=#fefefe
| 579633 ||  || — || September 30, 2003 || Kitt Peak || Spacewatch ||  || align=right data-sort-value="0.90" | 900 m || 
|-id=634 bgcolor=#fefefe
| 579634 ||  || — || October 22, 2014 || Mount Lemmon || Mount Lemmon Survey ||  || align=right data-sort-value="0.58" | 580 m || 
|-id=635 bgcolor=#E9E9E9
| 579635 ||  || — || October 26, 2014 || Mount Lemmon || Mount Lemmon Survey ||  || align=right | 1.8 km || 
|-id=636 bgcolor=#fefefe
| 579636 ||  || — || October 12, 2010 || Kitt Peak || Spacewatch ||  || align=right data-sort-value="0.74" | 740 m || 
|-id=637 bgcolor=#E9E9E9
| 579637 ||  || — || December 14, 2010 || Mount Lemmon || Mount Lemmon Survey ||  || align=right | 1.1 km || 
|-id=638 bgcolor=#E9E9E9
| 579638 ||  || — || October 26, 2014 || Mount Lemmon || Mount Lemmon Survey ||  || align=right | 1.3 km || 
|-id=639 bgcolor=#fefefe
| 579639 ||  || — || October 28, 2014 || Haleakala || Pan-STARRS ||  || align=right data-sort-value="0.80" | 800 m || 
|-id=640 bgcolor=#d6d6d6
| 579640 ||  || — || October 29, 2014 || Haleakala || Pan-STARRS ||  || align=right | 2.2 km || 
|-id=641 bgcolor=#d6d6d6
| 579641 ||  || — || October 23, 2014 || Nogales || M. Schwartz, P. R. Holvorcem ||  || align=right | 2.5 km || 
|-id=642 bgcolor=#E9E9E9
| 579642 ||  || — || January 8, 2016 || Haleakala || Pan-STARRS ||  || align=right data-sort-value="0.94" | 940 m || 
|-id=643 bgcolor=#C2FFFF
| 579643 ||  || — || October 17, 2014 || Kitt Peak || Spacewatch || L5 || align=right | 10 km || 
|-id=644 bgcolor=#C2FFFF
| 579644 ||  || — || August 14, 2012 || Haleakala || Pan-STARRS || L5 || align=right | 8.0 km || 
|-id=645 bgcolor=#C2FFFF
| 579645 ||  || — || October 31, 2014 || Mount Lemmon || Mount Lemmon Survey || L5 || align=right | 7.0 km || 
|-id=646 bgcolor=#C2FFFF
| 579646 ||  || — || October 28, 2014 || Kitt Peak || Spacewatch || L5 || align=right | 7.5 km || 
|-id=647 bgcolor=#fefefe
| 579647 ||  || — || November 28, 2003 || Kitt Peak || Spacewatch ||  || align=right data-sort-value="0.64" | 640 m || 
|-id=648 bgcolor=#fefefe
| 579648 ||  || — || October 21, 2014 || Mount Lemmon || Mount Lemmon Survey ||  || align=right data-sort-value="0.60" | 600 m || 
|-id=649 bgcolor=#C2FFFF
| 579649 ||  || — || October 3, 2014 || Mount Lemmon || Mount Lemmon Survey || L5 || align=right | 11 km || 
|-id=650 bgcolor=#C2FFFF
| 579650 ||  || — || May 6, 2011 || Mount Lemmon || Mount Lemmon Survey || L5 || align=right | 10 km || 
|-id=651 bgcolor=#E9E9E9
| 579651 ||  || — || November 12, 2014 || Haleakala || Pan-STARRS ||  || align=right | 1.2 km || 
|-id=652 bgcolor=#E9E9E9
| 579652 ||  || — || October 29, 2010 || Mount Lemmon || Mount Lemmon Survey ||  || align=right | 1.2 km || 
|-id=653 bgcolor=#fefefe
| 579653 ||  || — || October 18, 2014 || Mount Lemmon || Mount Lemmon Survey ||  || align=right data-sort-value="0.76" | 760 m || 
|-id=654 bgcolor=#E9E9E9
| 579654 ||  || — || October 3, 2014 || Mount Lemmon || Mount Lemmon Survey ||  || align=right | 1.2 km || 
|-id=655 bgcolor=#fefefe
| 579655 ||  || — || October 6, 2010 || Bisei SG Center || T. Sakamoto, S. Urakawa ||  || align=right data-sort-value="0.70" | 700 m || 
|-id=656 bgcolor=#d6d6d6
| 579656 ||  || — || November 8, 2009 || Mount Lemmon || Mount Lemmon Survey ||  || align=right | 2.2 km || 
|-id=657 bgcolor=#E9E9E9
| 579657 ||  || — || October 31, 2014 || Kitt Peak || Spacewatch ||  || align=right data-sort-value="0.80" | 800 m || 
|-id=658 bgcolor=#C2FFFF
| 579658 ||  || — || September 15, 2013 || Haleakala || Pan-STARRS || L5 || align=right | 9.7 km || 
|-id=659 bgcolor=#d6d6d6
| 579659 ||  || — || February 20, 2002 || Kitt Peak || Spacewatch ||  || align=right | 2.0 km || 
|-id=660 bgcolor=#C2FFFF
| 579660 ||  || — || September 2, 2014 || La Palma || La Palma Obs. || L5 || align=right | 8.5 km || 
|-id=661 bgcolor=#E9E9E9
| 579661 ||  || — || February 26, 2011 || Catalina || CSS ||  || align=right | 1.4 km || 
|-id=662 bgcolor=#E9E9E9
| 579662 ||  || — || November 15, 2014 || Mount Lemmon || Mount Lemmon Survey ||  || align=right | 1.2 km || 
|-id=663 bgcolor=#E9E9E9
| 579663 ||  || — || November 9, 2014 || Haleakala || Pan-STARRS ||  || align=right | 1.0 km || 
|-id=664 bgcolor=#C2FFFF
| 579664 ||  || — || March 13, 2007 || Mount Lemmon || Mount Lemmon Survey || L5 || align=right | 6.9 km || 
|-id=665 bgcolor=#fefefe
| 579665 ||  || — || August 31, 2003 || Haleakala || AMOS ||  || align=right data-sort-value="0.69" | 690 m || 
|-id=666 bgcolor=#fefefe
| 579666 ||  || — || September 27, 2003 || Kitt Peak || Spacewatch ||  || align=right data-sort-value="0.62" | 620 m || 
|-id=667 bgcolor=#E9E9E9
| 579667 ||  || — || October 14, 2001 || Apache Point || SDSS Collaboration ||  || align=right | 1.2 km || 
|-id=668 bgcolor=#d6d6d6
| 579668 ||  || — || October 25, 2014 || Haleakala || Pan-STARRS ||  || align=right | 2.9 km || 
|-id=669 bgcolor=#fefefe
| 579669 ||  || — || September 10, 2001 || Socorro || LINEAR || H || align=right data-sort-value="0.79" | 790 m || 
|-id=670 bgcolor=#E9E9E9
| 579670 ||  || — || November 14, 2010 || Kitt Peak || Spacewatch ||  || align=right data-sort-value="0.75" | 750 m || 
|-id=671 bgcolor=#E9E9E9
| 579671 ||  || — || November 16, 2014 || Mount Lemmon || Mount Lemmon Survey ||  || align=right data-sort-value="0.82" | 820 m || 
|-id=672 bgcolor=#E9E9E9
| 579672 ||  || — || October 21, 2014 || Mount Lemmon || Mount Lemmon Survey ||  || align=right | 1.2 km || 
|-id=673 bgcolor=#fefefe
| 579673 ||  || — || May 9, 2013 || Haleakala || Pan-STARRS ||  || align=right data-sort-value="0.93" | 930 m || 
|-id=674 bgcolor=#E9E9E9
| 579674 ||  || — || October 31, 2006 || Kitt Peak || Spacewatch ||  || align=right data-sort-value="0.97" | 970 m || 
|-id=675 bgcolor=#d6d6d6
| 579675 ||  || — || September 29, 2008 || Mount Lemmon || Mount Lemmon Survey ||  || align=right | 2.7 km || 
|-id=676 bgcolor=#fefefe
| 579676 ||  || — || September 15, 2010 || Mount Lemmon || Mount Lemmon Survey ||  || align=right data-sort-value="0.63" | 630 m || 
|-id=677 bgcolor=#fefefe
| 579677 ||  || — || May 4, 2009 || Siding Spring || SSS ||  || align=right data-sort-value="0.91" | 910 m || 
|-id=678 bgcolor=#fefefe
| 579678 ||  || — || October 26, 2014 || Mount Lemmon || Mount Lemmon Survey ||  || align=right data-sort-value="0.87" | 870 m || 
|-id=679 bgcolor=#fefefe
| 579679 ||  || — || October 11, 2006 || Kitt Peak || Spacewatch ||  || align=right data-sort-value="0.71" | 710 m || 
|-id=680 bgcolor=#E9E9E9
| 579680 ||  || — || October 26, 2014 || Haleakala || Pan-STARRS ||  || align=right | 1.4 km || 
|-id=681 bgcolor=#fefefe
| 579681 ||  || — || December 4, 2007 || Mount Lemmon || Mount Lemmon Survey ||  || align=right data-sort-value="0.69" | 690 m || 
|-id=682 bgcolor=#fefefe
| 579682 ||  || — || August 22, 2003 || Palomar || NEAT ||  || align=right data-sort-value="0.65" | 650 m || 
|-id=683 bgcolor=#fefefe
| 579683 ||  || — || November 4, 2007 || Kitt Peak || Spacewatch ||  || align=right data-sort-value="0.83" | 830 m || 
|-id=684 bgcolor=#fefefe
| 579684 ||  || — || December 30, 2007 || Mount Lemmon || Mount Lemmon Survey ||  || align=right data-sort-value="0.55" | 550 m || 
|-id=685 bgcolor=#fefefe
| 579685 ||  || — || September 3, 2010 || Mount Lemmon || Mount Lemmon Survey ||  || align=right data-sort-value="0.49" | 490 m || 
|-id=686 bgcolor=#fefefe
| 579686 ||  || — || November 9, 2007 || Mount Lemmon || Mount Lemmon Survey ||  || align=right data-sort-value="0.83" | 830 m || 
|-id=687 bgcolor=#fefefe
| 579687 ||  || — || November 20, 2014 || Mount Lemmon || Mount Lemmon Survey || H || align=right data-sort-value="0.75" | 750 m || 
|-id=688 bgcolor=#fefefe
| 579688 ||  || — || February 28, 2008 || Kitt Peak || Spacewatch ||  || align=right data-sort-value="0.72" | 720 m || 
|-id=689 bgcolor=#fefefe
| 579689 ||  || — || February 20, 2009 || Mount Lemmon || Mount Lemmon Survey ||  || align=right data-sort-value="0.45" | 450 m || 
|-id=690 bgcolor=#fefefe
| 579690 ||  || — || August 31, 2014 || Haleakala || Pan-STARRS ||  || align=right data-sort-value="0.60" | 600 m || 
|-id=691 bgcolor=#d6d6d6
| 579691 ||  || — || October 2, 2006 || Mount Lemmon || Mount Lemmon Survey || 3:2 || align=right | 2.6 km || 
|-id=692 bgcolor=#fefefe
| 579692 ||  || — || September 20, 2014 || Haleakala || Pan-STARRS ||  || align=right data-sort-value="0.68" | 680 m || 
|-id=693 bgcolor=#E9E9E9
| 579693 ||  || — || November 17, 2014 || Mount Lemmon || Mount Lemmon Survey ||  || align=right | 1.6 km || 
|-id=694 bgcolor=#E9E9E9
| 579694 ||  || — || August 28, 2009 || Kitt Peak || Spacewatch ||  || align=right | 1.1 km || 
|-id=695 bgcolor=#E9E9E9
| 579695 ||  || — || May 8, 2008 || Kitt Peak || Spacewatch ||  || align=right data-sort-value="0.91" | 910 m || 
|-id=696 bgcolor=#fefefe
| 579696 ||  || — || November 2, 2007 || Mount Lemmon || Mount Lemmon Survey ||  || align=right data-sort-value="0.74" | 740 m || 
|-id=697 bgcolor=#fefefe
| 579697 ||  || — || February 3, 2012 || Haleakala || Pan-STARRS ||  || align=right data-sort-value="0.56" | 560 m || 
|-id=698 bgcolor=#fefefe
| 579698 ||  || — || September 16, 2010 || Kitt Peak || Spacewatch ||  || align=right data-sort-value="0.67" | 670 m || 
|-id=699 bgcolor=#fefefe
| 579699 ||  || — || November 20, 2003 || Apache Point || SDSS Collaboration ||  || align=right data-sort-value="0.67" | 670 m || 
|-id=700 bgcolor=#fefefe
| 579700 ||  || — || July 15, 2002 || Palomar || NEAT ||  || align=right | 1.1 km || 
|}

579701–579800 

|-bgcolor=#E9E9E9
| 579701 ||  || — || July 1, 2013 || Haleakala || Pan-STARRS ||  || align=right data-sort-value="0.90" | 900 m || 
|-id=702 bgcolor=#E9E9E9
| 579702 ||  || — || September 3, 2005 || Palomar || NEAT ||  || align=right | 2.3 km || 
|-id=703 bgcolor=#E9E9E9
| 579703 ||  || — || January 27, 2007 || Mount Lemmon || Mount Lemmon Survey ||  || align=right | 1.2 km || 
|-id=704 bgcolor=#E9E9E9
| 579704 ||  || — || September 3, 2000 || Apache Point || SDSS Collaboration ||  || align=right | 1.9 km || 
|-id=705 bgcolor=#C2FFFF
| 579705 ||  || — || October 23, 2014 || Kitt Peak || Spacewatch || L5 || align=right | 7.9 km || 
|-id=706 bgcolor=#E9E9E9
| 579706 ||  || — || October 30, 2014 || Charleston || R. Holmes ||  || align=right | 1.1 km || 
|-id=707 bgcolor=#fefefe
| 579707 ||  || — || November 17, 2014 || Haleakala || Pan-STARRS ||  || align=right data-sort-value="0.66" | 660 m || 
|-id=708 bgcolor=#E9E9E9
| 579708 ||  || — || November 17, 2014 || Haleakala || Pan-STARRS ||  || align=right | 1.3 km || 
|-id=709 bgcolor=#E9E9E9
| 579709 ||  || — || November 17, 2014 || Haleakala || Pan-STARRS ||  || align=right | 1.8 km || 
|-id=710 bgcolor=#E9E9E9
| 579710 ||  || — || August 30, 2005 || Kitt Peak || Spacewatch ||  || align=right data-sort-value="0.87" | 870 m || 
|-id=711 bgcolor=#E9E9E9
| 579711 ||  || — || November 17, 2014 || Haleakala || Pan-STARRS ||  || align=right | 1.1 km || 
|-id=712 bgcolor=#C2FFFF
| 579712 ||  || — || November 17, 2014 || Haleakala || Pan-STARRS || L5 || align=right | 6.7 km || 
|-id=713 bgcolor=#E9E9E9
| 579713 ||  || — || April 3, 2008 || Mount Lemmon || Mount Lemmon Survey ||  || align=right data-sort-value="0.94" | 940 m || 
|-id=714 bgcolor=#fefefe
| 579714 ||  || — || October 27, 2003 || Kitt Peak || Spacewatch ||  || align=right data-sort-value="0.89" | 890 m || 
|-id=715 bgcolor=#E9E9E9
| 579715 ||  || — || September 5, 2010 || Mount Lemmon || Mount Lemmon Survey ||  || align=right data-sort-value="0.82" | 820 m || 
|-id=716 bgcolor=#E9E9E9
| 579716 ||  || — || September 11, 2010 || Mount Lemmon || Mount Lemmon Survey ||  || align=right data-sort-value="0.62" | 620 m || 
|-id=717 bgcolor=#E9E9E9
| 579717 ||  || — || October 25, 2014 || Mount Lemmon || Mount Lemmon Survey ||  || align=right data-sort-value="0.88" | 880 m || 
|-id=718 bgcolor=#E9E9E9
| 579718 ||  || — || April 9, 2003 || Kitt Peak || Spacewatch ||  || align=right | 1.3 km || 
|-id=719 bgcolor=#fefefe
| 579719 ||  || — || March 27, 2004 || Kitt Peak || Spacewatch ||  || align=right data-sort-value="0.63" | 630 m || 
|-id=720 bgcolor=#fefefe
| 579720 ||  || — || August 25, 2014 || Haleakala || Pan-STARRS ||  || align=right data-sort-value="0.86" | 860 m || 
|-id=721 bgcolor=#fefefe
| 579721 ||  || — || March 2, 2009 || Mount Lemmon || Mount Lemmon Survey ||  || align=right data-sort-value="0.82" | 820 m || 
|-id=722 bgcolor=#E9E9E9
| 579722 ||  || — || October 14, 2001 || Apache Point || SDSS Collaboration ||  || align=right | 1.4 km || 
|-id=723 bgcolor=#fefefe
| 579723 ||  || — || August 25, 2014 || Haleakala || Pan-STARRS ||  || align=right data-sort-value="0.68" | 680 m || 
|-id=724 bgcolor=#fefefe
| 579724 ||  || — || March 18, 2012 || Piszkesteto || K. Sárneczky ||  || align=right data-sort-value="0.87" | 870 m || 
|-id=725 bgcolor=#fefefe
| 579725 ||  || — || March 16, 2012 || Piszkesteto || K. Sárneczky ||  || align=right data-sort-value="0.98" | 980 m || 
|-id=726 bgcolor=#E9E9E9
| 579726 ||  || — || December 25, 2006 || Catalina || CSS ||  || align=right | 1.3 km || 
|-id=727 bgcolor=#E9E9E9
| 579727 ||  || — || October 16, 2001 || Palomar || NEAT ||  || align=right | 1.3 km || 
|-id=728 bgcolor=#E9E9E9
| 579728 ||  || — || August 15, 2009 || Kitt Peak || Spacewatch ||  || align=right | 1.4 km || 
|-id=729 bgcolor=#E9E9E9
| 579729 ||  || — || December 24, 2006 || Kitt Peak || Spacewatch ||  || align=right | 1.2 km || 
|-id=730 bgcolor=#E9E9E9
| 579730 ||  || — || March 8, 2003 || Socorro || LINEAR ||  || align=right | 1.5 km || 
|-id=731 bgcolor=#FA8072
| 579731 ||  || — || October 11, 2007 || Catalina || CSS ||  || align=right data-sort-value="0.78" | 780 m || 
|-id=732 bgcolor=#fefefe
| 579732 ||  || — || October 18, 2014 || Kitt Peak || Spacewatch || H || align=right data-sort-value="0.53" | 530 m || 
|-id=733 bgcolor=#E9E9E9
| 579733 ||  || — || December 26, 2006 || Kitt Peak || Spacewatch ||  || align=right | 1.5 km || 
|-id=734 bgcolor=#C2FFFF
| 579734 ||  || — || October 14, 2013 || Mount Lemmon || Mount Lemmon Survey || L5 || align=right | 8.8 km || 
|-id=735 bgcolor=#FA8072
| 579735 ||  || — || June 22, 2010 || Mount Lemmon || Mount Lemmon Survey ||  || align=right data-sort-value="0.70" | 700 m || 
|-id=736 bgcolor=#E9E9E9
| 579736 ||  || — || October 3, 2005 || Kitt Peak || Spacewatch ||  || align=right | 1.3 km || 
|-id=737 bgcolor=#fefefe
| 579737 ||  || — || January 19, 2012 || Haleakala || Pan-STARRS ||  || align=right data-sort-value="0.64" | 640 m || 
|-id=738 bgcolor=#fefefe
| 579738 ||  || — || September 30, 2010 || Mount Lemmon || Mount Lemmon Survey ||  || align=right data-sort-value="0.89" | 890 m || 
|-id=739 bgcolor=#FA8072
| 579739 ||  || — || October 20, 2003 || Palomar || NEAT ||  || align=right data-sort-value="0.77" | 770 m || 
|-id=740 bgcolor=#fefefe
| 579740 ||  || — || September 15, 2010 || Mount Lemmon || Mount Lemmon Survey || V || align=right data-sort-value="0.52" | 520 m || 
|-id=741 bgcolor=#fefefe
| 579741 ||  || — || September 5, 2010 || Mount Lemmon || Mount Lemmon Survey ||  || align=right data-sort-value="0.64" | 640 m || 
|-id=742 bgcolor=#E9E9E9
| 579742 ||  || — || November 19, 2014 || iTelescope || J. Jahn ||  || align=right | 1.0 km || 
|-id=743 bgcolor=#E9E9E9
| 579743 ||  || — || January 9, 2002 || Kitt Peak || Spacewatch ||  || align=right | 1.8 km || 
|-id=744 bgcolor=#E9E9E9
| 579744 ||  || — || March 11, 2003 || Kitt Peak || Spacewatch ||  || align=right | 1.2 km || 
|-id=745 bgcolor=#E9E9E9
| 579745 ||  || — || November 7, 2010 || Mount Lemmon || Mount Lemmon Survey || JUN || align=right data-sort-value="0.91" | 910 m || 
|-id=746 bgcolor=#fefefe
| 579746 ||  || — || April 15, 2010 || Mount Lemmon || Mount Lemmon Survey ||  || align=right data-sort-value="0.73" | 730 m || 
|-id=747 bgcolor=#d6d6d6
| 579747 ||  || — || January 4, 2011 || Mount Lemmon || Mount Lemmon Survey ||  || align=right | 2.4 km || 
|-id=748 bgcolor=#fefefe
| 579748 ||  || — || December 29, 2003 || Kitt Peak || Spacewatch ||  || align=right data-sort-value="0.72" | 720 m || 
|-id=749 bgcolor=#E9E9E9
| 579749 ||  || — || December 6, 2010 || Mount Lemmon || Mount Lemmon Survey ||  || align=right data-sort-value="0.85" | 850 m || 
|-id=750 bgcolor=#d6d6d6
| 579750 ||  || — || September 6, 2008 || Mount Lemmon || Mount Lemmon Survey ||  || align=right | 2.0 km || 
|-id=751 bgcolor=#fefefe
| 579751 ||  || — || February 3, 2008 || Mount Lemmon || Mount Lemmon Survey ||  || align=right data-sort-value="0.85" | 850 m || 
|-id=752 bgcolor=#fefefe
| 579752 ||  || — || June 21, 2010 || Mount Lemmon || Mount Lemmon Survey ||  || align=right data-sort-value="0.60" | 600 m || 
|-id=753 bgcolor=#E9E9E9
| 579753 ||  || — || November 21, 2014 || Haleakala || Pan-STARRS ||  || align=right data-sort-value="0.69" | 690 m || 
|-id=754 bgcolor=#E9E9E9
| 579754 ||  || — || January 8, 2011 || Mount Lemmon || Mount Lemmon Survey ||  || align=right | 1.3 km || 
|-id=755 bgcolor=#E9E9E9
| 579755 ||  || — || April 29, 2008 || Kitt Peak || Spacewatch ||  || align=right | 1.2 km || 
|-id=756 bgcolor=#E9E9E9
| 579756 ||  || — || May 28, 2008 || Mount Lemmon || Mount Lemmon Survey || EUN || align=right data-sort-value="0.81" | 810 m || 
|-id=757 bgcolor=#E9E9E9
| 579757 ||  || — || December 2, 2010 || Mount Lemmon || Mount Lemmon Survey ||  || align=right data-sort-value="0.94" | 940 m || 
|-id=758 bgcolor=#E9E9E9
| 579758 ||  || — || November 20, 2006 || Kitt Peak || Spacewatch ||  || align=right data-sort-value="0.85" | 850 m || 
|-id=759 bgcolor=#E9E9E9
| 579759 ||  || — || March 9, 2003 || Palomar || NEAT ||  || align=right | 2.0 km || 
|-id=760 bgcolor=#E9E9E9
| 579760 ||  || — || March 13, 2004 || Palomar || NEAT || EUN || align=right | 1.3 km || 
|-id=761 bgcolor=#E9E9E9
| 579761 ||  || — || December 10, 2010 || Mount Lemmon || Mount Lemmon Survey ||  || align=right | 1.4 km || 
|-id=762 bgcolor=#d6d6d6
| 579762 ||  || — || July 29, 2014 || Haleakala || Pan-STARRS ||  || align=right | 2.8 km || 
|-id=763 bgcolor=#d6d6d6
| 579763 ||  || — || February 1, 2006 || Kitt Peak || Spacewatch ||  || align=right | 2.9 km || 
|-id=764 bgcolor=#fefefe
| 579764 ||  || — || December 5, 2007 || Kitt Peak || Spacewatch ||  || align=right data-sort-value="0.76" | 760 m || 
|-id=765 bgcolor=#E9E9E9
| 579765 ||  || — || September 2, 2014 || Haleakala || Pan-STARRS ||  || align=right | 1.2 km || 
|-id=766 bgcolor=#fefefe
| 579766 ||  || — || October 23, 2003 || Apache Point || SDSS Collaboration ||  || align=right data-sort-value="0.81" | 810 m || 
|-id=767 bgcolor=#fefefe
| 579767 ||  || — || October 20, 2003 || Kitt Peak || Spacewatch ||  || align=right data-sort-value="0.93" | 930 m || 
|-id=768 bgcolor=#fefefe
| 579768 ||  || — || August 30, 2014 || Haleakala || Pan-STARRS ||  || align=right data-sort-value="0.91" | 910 m || 
|-id=769 bgcolor=#fefefe
| 579769 ||  || — || October 29, 2014 || Haleakala || Pan-STARRS ||  || align=right data-sort-value="0.75" | 750 m || 
|-id=770 bgcolor=#E9E9E9
| 579770 ||  || — || March 25, 2012 || Mount Lemmon || Mount Lemmon Survey ||  || align=right data-sort-value="0.77" | 770 m || 
|-id=771 bgcolor=#fefefe
| 579771 ||  || — || September 4, 2014 || Haleakala || Pan-STARRS ||  || align=right data-sort-value="0.83" | 830 m || 
|-id=772 bgcolor=#E9E9E9
| 579772 ||  || — || November 22, 2014 || Haleakala || Pan-STARRS ||  || align=right data-sort-value="0.91" | 910 m || 
|-id=773 bgcolor=#E9E9E9
| 579773 ||  || — || December 11, 2010 || Mount Lemmon || Mount Lemmon Survey ||  || align=right | 1.5 km || 
|-id=774 bgcolor=#E9E9E9
| 579774 ||  || — || April 15, 2012 || Haleakala || Pan-STARRS ||  || align=right data-sort-value="0.87" | 870 m || 
|-id=775 bgcolor=#E9E9E9
| 579775 ||  || — || April 27, 2012 || Haleakala || Pan-STARRS ||  || align=right data-sort-value="0.98" | 980 m || 
|-id=776 bgcolor=#E9E9E9
| 579776 ||  || — || March 10, 2008 || Kitt Peak || Spacewatch ||  || align=right data-sort-value="0.98" | 980 m || 
|-id=777 bgcolor=#d6d6d6
| 579777 ||  || — || September 6, 2008 || Kitt Peak || Spacewatch ||  || align=right | 2.7 km || 
|-id=778 bgcolor=#fefefe
| 579778 ||  || — || July 1, 2013 || Haleakala || Pan-STARRS ||  || align=right data-sort-value="0.70" | 700 m || 
|-id=779 bgcolor=#fefefe
| 579779 ||  || — || October 26, 2014 || Mount Lemmon || Mount Lemmon Survey ||  || align=right data-sort-value="0.77" | 770 m || 
|-id=780 bgcolor=#fefefe
| 579780 ||  || — || February 3, 2012 || Haleakala || Pan-STARRS ||  || align=right data-sort-value="0.89" | 890 m || 
|-id=781 bgcolor=#E9E9E9
| 579781 ||  || — || December 9, 2010 || Mount Lemmon || Mount Lemmon Survey ||  || align=right | 1.0 km || 
|-id=782 bgcolor=#fefefe
| 579782 ||  || — || November 22, 2014 || Haleakala || Pan-STARRS || H || align=right data-sort-value="0.57" | 570 m || 
|-id=783 bgcolor=#fefefe
| 579783 ||  || — || November 1, 2006 || Kitt Peak || Spacewatch ||  || align=right data-sort-value="0.85" | 850 m || 
|-id=784 bgcolor=#fefefe
| 579784 ||  || — || July 2, 2013 || Haleakala || Pan-STARRS ||  || align=right | 1.0 km || 
|-id=785 bgcolor=#fefefe
| 579785 ||  || — || October 7, 2010 || Piszkesteto || Z. Kuli || V || align=right data-sort-value="0.68" | 680 m || 
|-id=786 bgcolor=#fefefe
| 579786 ||  || — || October 21, 2014 || Mount Lemmon || Mount Lemmon Survey ||  || align=right data-sort-value="0.59" | 590 m || 
|-id=787 bgcolor=#fefefe
| 579787 ||  || — || December 29, 2007 || Costitx || OAM Obs. ||  || align=right | 1.1 km || 
|-id=788 bgcolor=#E9E9E9
| 579788 ||  || — || November 23, 2014 || Mount Lemmon || Mount Lemmon Survey ||  || align=right | 1.7 km || 
|-id=789 bgcolor=#E9E9E9
| 579789 ||  || — || November 23, 2014 || Haleakala || Pan-STARRS ||  || align=right | 1.5 km || 
|-id=790 bgcolor=#fefefe
| 579790 ||  || — || December 5, 2007 || Mount Lemmon || Mount Lemmon Survey ||  || align=right data-sort-value="0.97" | 970 m || 
|-id=791 bgcolor=#E9E9E9
| 579791 ||  || — || November 23, 2014 || Mount Lemmon || Mount Lemmon Survey ||  || align=right | 2.5 km || 
|-id=792 bgcolor=#E9E9E9
| 579792 ||  || — || October 28, 2014 || Haleakala || Pan-STARRS ||  || align=right | 1.0 km || 
|-id=793 bgcolor=#d6d6d6
| 579793 ||  || — || October 12, 2006 || Palomar || NEAT || Tj (2.91) || align=right | 4.7 km || 
|-id=794 bgcolor=#E9E9E9
| 579794 ||  || — || March 30, 2003 || Kitt Peak || Spacewatch ||  || align=right | 1.0 km || 
|-id=795 bgcolor=#C2FFFF
| 579795 ||  || — || May 30, 2009 || Mount Lemmon || Mount Lemmon Survey || L5 || align=right | 8.1 km || 
|-id=796 bgcolor=#E9E9E9
| 579796 ||  || — || December 25, 2006 || Kitt Peak || Spacewatch ||  || align=right data-sort-value="0.87" | 870 m || 
|-id=797 bgcolor=#E9E9E9
| 579797 ||  || — || September 15, 2009 || Mount Lemmon || Mount Lemmon Survey ||  || align=right data-sort-value="0.90" | 900 m || 
|-id=798 bgcolor=#E9E9E9
| 579798 ||  || — || August 30, 2005 || Kitt Peak || Spacewatch ||  || align=right data-sort-value="0.93" | 930 m || 
|-id=799 bgcolor=#E9E9E9
| 579799 ||  || — || January 10, 2007 || Mount Lemmon || Mount Lemmon Survey ||  || align=right data-sort-value="0.71" | 710 m || 
|-id=800 bgcolor=#C2FFFF
| 579800 ||  || — || November 20, 2014 || Haleakala || Pan-STARRS || L5 || align=right | 8.2 km || 
|}

579801–579900 

|-bgcolor=#E9E9E9
| 579801 ||  || — || November 26, 2014 || Haleakala || Pan-STARRS ||  || align=right | 1.2 km || 
|-id=802 bgcolor=#E9E9E9
| 579802 ||  || — || November 26, 2014 || Haleakala || Pan-STARRS ||  || align=right | 1.1 km || 
|-id=803 bgcolor=#fefefe
| 579803 ||  || — || April 17, 2009 || Kitt Peak || Spacewatch ||  || align=right data-sort-value="0.73" | 730 m || 
|-id=804 bgcolor=#E9E9E9
| 579804 ||  || — || November 26, 2014 || Haleakala || Pan-STARRS ||  || align=right data-sort-value="0.98" | 980 m || 
|-id=805 bgcolor=#fefefe
| 579805 ||  || — || November 26, 2014 || Haleakala || Pan-STARRS ||  || align=right data-sort-value="0.77" | 770 m || 
|-id=806 bgcolor=#fefefe
| 579806 ||  || — || March 16, 2012 || Piszkesteto || K. Sárneczky ||  || align=right | 1.2 km || 
|-id=807 bgcolor=#E9E9E9
| 579807 ||  || — || November 17, 2014 || Mount Lemmon || Mount Lemmon Survey ||  || align=right data-sort-value="0.82" | 820 m || 
|-id=808 bgcolor=#E9E9E9
| 579808 ||  || — || August 27, 2005 || Palomar || NEAT ||  || align=right data-sort-value="0.99" | 990 m || 
|-id=809 bgcolor=#E9E9E9
| 579809 ||  || — || November 26, 2014 || Haleakala || Pan-STARRS ||  || align=right | 1.1 km || 
|-id=810 bgcolor=#E9E9E9
| 579810 ||  || — || April 8, 2002 || Palomar || NEAT ||  || align=right | 2.1 km || 
|-id=811 bgcolor=#E9E9E9
| 579811 ||  || — || July 24, 2003 || Palomar || NEAT ||  || align=right | 2.9 km || 
|-id=812 bgcolor=#E9E9E9
| 579812 ||  || — || February 26, 2011 || Kitt Peak || Spacewatch ||  || align=right | 1.5 km || 
|-id=813 bgcolor=#E9E9E9
| 579813 ||  || — || September 7, 2004 || Kitt Peak || Spacewatch ||  || align=right | 2.2 km || 
|-id=814 bgcolor=#E9E9E9
| 579814 ||  || — || March 9, 2003 || Anderson Mesa || LONEOS ||  || align=right | 1.2 km || 
|-id=815 bgcolor=#E9E9E9
| 579815 ||  || — || September 12, 2005 || Kitt Peak || Spacewatch ||  || align=right | 1.1 km || 
|-id=816 bgcolor=#E9E9E9
| 579816 ||  || — || November 4, 2014 || Mount Lemmon || Mount Lemmon Survey ||  || align=right | 1.6 km || 
|-id=817 bgcolor=#E9E9E9
| 579817 ||  || — || November 16, 2014 || Mount Lemmon || Mount Lemmon Survey ||  || align=right | 1.1 km || 
|-id=818 bgcolor=#E9E9E9
| 579818 ||  || — || May 12, 2012 || Haleakala || Pan-STARRS ||  || align=right | 1.4 km || 
|-id=819 bgcolor=#fefefe
| 579819 ||  || — || November 3, 2010 || Mount Lemmon || Mount Lemmon Survey ||  || align=right data-sort-value="0.74" | 740 m || 
|-id=820 bgcolor=#E9E9E9
| 579820 ||  || — || October 23, 2014 || Nogales || M. Schwartz, P. R. Holvorcem ||  || align=right | 1.2 km || 
|-id=821 bgcolor=#E9E9E9
| 579821 ||  || — || December 5, 2010 || Mount Lemmon || Mount Lemmon Survey ||  || align=right | 1.5 km || 
|-id=822 bgcolor=#E9E9E9
| 579822 ||  || — || February 24, 2012 || Kitt Peak || Spacewatch ||  || align=right | 1.6 km || 
|-id=823 bgcolor=#E9E9E9
| 579823 ||  || — || December 10, 2010 || Mount Lemmon || Mount Lemmon Survey ||  || align=right | 1.2 km || 
|-id=824 bgcolor=#C2FFFF
| 579824 ||  || — || August 24, 2012 || Kitt Peak || Spacewatch || L5 || align=right | 7.2 km || 
|-id=825 bgcolor=#E9E9E9
| 579825 ||  || — || March 23, 2012 || Mount Lemmon || Mount Lemmon Survey ||  || align=right data-sort-value="0.86" | 860 m || 
|-id=826 bgcolor=#d6d6d6
| 579826 ||  || — || November 17, 2014 || Haleakala || Pan-STARRS || 7:4 || align=right | 3.2 km || 
|-id=827 bgcolor=#E9E9E9
| 579827 ||  || — || May 1, 2011 || Haleakala || Pan-STARRS ||  || align=right | 2.2 km || 
|-id=828 bgcolor=#E9E9E9
| 579828 ||  || — || April 22, 2007 || Gaisberg || R. Gierlinger || RAF || align=right data-sort-value="0.80" | 800 m || 
|-id=829 bgcolor=#E9E9E9
| 579829 ||  || — || November 27, 2014 || Haleakala || Pan-STARRS ||  || align=right | 2.1 km || 
|-id=830 bgcolor=#E9E9E9
| 579830 ||  || — || October 23, 2001 || Palomar || NEAT || (5) || align=right | 1.2 km || 
|-id=831 bgcolor=#E9E9E9
| 579831 ||  || — || January 20, 2002 || Anderson Mesa || LONEOS ||  || align=right | 2.0 km || 
|-id=832 bgcolor=#E9E9E9
| 579832 ||  || — || November 25, 2005 || Mount Lemmon || Mount Lemmon Survey ||  || align=right | 1.8 km || 
|-id=833 bgcolor=#E9E9E9
| 579833 ||  || — || March 11, 2011 || Catalina || CSS ||  || align=right | 1.6 km || 
|-id=834 bgcolor=#E9E9E9
| 579834 ||  || — || June 2, 2008 || Mount Lemmon || Mount Lemmon Survey ||  || align=right | 2.9 km || 
|-id=835 bgcolor=#fefefe
| 579835 ||  || — || August 14, 2013 || ASC-Kislovodsk || V. Linkov, K. Polyakov ||  || align=right | 1.3 km || 
|-id=836 bgcolor=#fefefe
| 579836 ||  || — || January 18, 2007 || Palomar || NEAT ||  || align=right data-sort-value="0.94" | 940 m || 
|-id=837 bgcolor=#fefefe
| 579837 ||  || — || February 6, 2007 || Palomar || NEAT || H || align=right data-sort-value="0.82" | 820 m || 
|-id=838 bgcolor=#E9E9E9
| 579838 ||  || — || May 6, 2003 || Kitt Peak || Spacewatch ||  || align=right | 1.8 km || 
|-id=839 bgcolor=#fefefe
| 579839 ||  || — || November 28, 2014 || Haleakala || Pan-STARRS ||  || align=right data-sort-value="0.87" | 870 m || 
|-id=840 bgcolor=#E9E9E9
| 579840 ||  || — || August 18, 2009 || Kitt Peak || Spacewatch ||  || align=right | 1.2 km || 
|-id=841 bgcolor=#E9E9E9
| 579841 ||  || — || October 27, 2005 || Kitt Peak || Spacewatch ||  || align=right | 1.5 km || 
|-id=842 bgcolor=#E9E9E9
| 579842 ||  || — || October 19, 2014 || Nogales || M. Schwartz, P. R. Holvorcem ||  || align=right | 2.9 km || 
|-id=843 bgcolor=#E9E9E9
| 579843 ||  || — || November 21, 2014 || Mount Lemmon || Mount Lemmon Survey ||  || align=right | 1.2 km || 
|-id=844 bgcolor=#E9E9E9
| 579844 ||  || — || October 30, 2005 || Mount Lemmon || Mount Lemmon Survey ||  || align=right | 1.2 km || 
|-id=845 bgcolor=#d6d6d6
| 579845 ||  || — || September 22, 2003 || Palomar || NEAT ||  || align=right | 3.1 km || 
|-id=846 bgcolor=#fefefe
| 579846 ||  || — || November 15, 2007 || Catalina || CSS ||  || align=right data-sort-value="0.81" | 810 m || 
|-id=847 bgcolor=#E9E9E9
| 579847 ||  || — || January 24, 2007 || Mount Lemmon || Mount Lemmon Survey ||  || align=right | 1.4 km || 
|-id=848 bgcolor=#d6d6d6
| 579848 ||  || — || October 21, 2014 || Catalina || CSS || Tj (2.96) || align=right | 2.5 km || 
|-id=849 bgcolor=#fefefe
| 579849 ||  || — || December 5, 2007 || Mount Lemmon || Mount Lemmon Survey ||  || align=right data-sort-value="0.97" | 970 m || 
|-id=850 bgcolor=#E9E9E9
| 579850 ||  || — || September 18, 2014 || Haleakala || Pan-STARRS ||  || align=right | 1.7 km || 
|-id=851 bgcolor=#E9E9E9
| 579851 ||  || — || January 16, 2007 || Mount Lemmon || Mount Lemmon Survey ||  || align=right data-sort-value="0.94" | 940 m || 
|-id=852 bgcolor=#fefefe
| 579852 ||  || — || November 24, 2014 || Kitt Peak || Spacewatch || H || align=right data-sort-value="0.57" | 570 m || 
|-id=853 bgcolor=#E9E9E9
| 579853 ||  || — || November 21, 2014 || Haleakala || Pan-STARRS ||  || align=right data-sort-value="0.99" | 990 m || 
|-id=854 bgcolor=#E9E9E9
| 579854 ||  || — || November 28, 2014 || Mount Lemmon || Mount Lemmon Survey ||  || align=right | 1.2 km || 
|-id=855 bgcolor=#E9E9E9
| 579855 ||  || — || November 16, 2014 || Haleakala || Pan-STARRS ||  || align=right | 1.0 km || 
|-id=856 bgcolor=#E9E9E9
| 579856 ||  || — || November 19, 2014 || Mount Lemmon || Mount Lemmon Survey ||  || align=right | 1.1 km || 
|-id=857 bgcolor=#E9E9E9
| 579857 ||  || — || October 15, 2001 || Palomar || NEAT ||  || align=right | 1.2 km || 
|-id=858 bgcolor=#E9E9E9
| 579858 ||  || — || March 4, 1994 || Kitt Peak || Spacewatch ||  || align=right | 1.2 km || 
|-id=859 bgcolor=#E9E9E9
| 579859 ||  || — || January 24, 2007 || Mount Lemmon || Mount Lemmon Survey ||  || align=right | 1.1 km || 
|-id=860 bgcolor=#E9E9E9
| 579860 ||  || — || January 30, 2011 || Haleakala || Pan-STARRS ||  || align=right | 2.1 km || 
|-id=861 bgcolor=#E9E9E9
| 579861 ||  || — || November 30, 2014 || Haleakala || Pan-STARRS ||  || align=right | 1.0 km || 
|-id=862 bgcolor=#E9E9E9
| 579862 ||  || — || January 17, 2016 || Haleakala || Pan-STARRS ||  || align=right data-sort-value="0.88" | 880 m || 
|-id=863 bgcolor=#E9E9E9
| 579863 ||  || — || November 24, 2014 || Mount Lemmon || Mount Lemmon Survey ||  || align=right | 1.3 km || 
|-id=864 bgcolor=#fefefe
| 579864 ||  || — || November 18, 2014 || Haleakala || Pan-STARRS ||  || align=right data-sort-value="0.45" | 450 m || 
|-id=865 bgcolor=#fefefe
| 579865 ||  || — || November 24, 2014 || Mount Lemmon || Mount Lemmon Survey || H || align=right data-sort-value="0.62" | 620 m || 
|-id=866 bgcolor=#E9E9E9
| 579866 ||  || — || November 21, 2014 || Haleakala || Pan-STARRS ||  || align=right | 2.3 km || 
|-id=867 bgcolor=#E9E9E9
| 579867 ||  || — || November 26, 2014 || Haleakala || Pan-STARRS ||  || align=right | 1.5 km || 
|-id=868 bgcolor=#E9E9E9
| 579868 ||  || — || November 20, 2014 || Mount Lemmon || Mount Lemmon Survey ||  || align=right | 1.0 km || 
|-id=869 bgcolor=#E9E9E9
| 579869 ||  || — || November 27, 2014 || Haleakala || Pan-STARRS ||  || align=right data-sort-value="0.95" | 950 m || 
|-id=870 bgcolor=#E9E9E9
| 579870 ||  || — || November 23, 2014 || Mount Lemmon || Mount Lemmon Survey ||  || align=right | 1.1 km || 
|-id=871 bgcolor=#E9E9E9
| 579871 ||  || — || November 18, 2014 || Haleakala || Pan-STARRS ||  || align=right | 2.0 km || 
|-id=872 bgcolor=#E9E9E9
| 579872 ||  || — || November 26, 2014 || Haleakala || Pan-STARRS ||  || align=right | 1.1 km || 
|-id=873 bgcolor=#E9E9E9
| 579873 ||  || — || February 20, 2002 || Kitt Peak || Spacewatch ||  || align=right | 1.7 km || 
|-id=874 bgcolor=#d6d6d6
| 579874 ||  || — || November 26, 2014 || Haleakala || Pan-STARRS ||  || align=right | 2.3 km || 
|-id=875 bgcolor=#E9E9E9
| 579875 ||  || — || November 28, 2014 || Mount Lemmon || Mount Lemmon Survey ||  || align=right | 1.4 km || 
|-id=876 bgcolor=#E9E9E9
| 579876 ||  || — || November 20, 2014 || Haleakala || Pan-STARRS ||  || align=right data-sort-value="0.73" | 730 m || 
|-id=877 bgcolor=#E9E9E9
| 579877 ||  || — || November 21, 2014 || Haleakala || Pan-STARRS ||  || align=right data-sort-value="0.91" | 910 m || 
|-id=878 bgcolor=#C2FFFF
| 579878 ||  || — || November 23, 2014 || Haleakala || Pan-STARRS || L5 || align=right | 8.5 km || 
|-id=879 bgcolor=#E9E9E9
| 579879 ||  || — || November 26, 2014 || Haleakala || Pan-STARRS ||  || align=right | 1.3 km || 
|-id=880 bgcolor=#E9E9E9
| 579880 ||  || — || November 29, 2014 || Kitt Peak || Spacewatch ||  || align=right data-sort-value="0.85" | 850 m || 
|-id=881 bgcolor=#E9E9E9
| 579881 ||  || — || November 20, 2014 || Haleakala || Pan-STARRS ||  || align=right | 1.4 km || 
|-id=882 bgcolor=#C2FFFF
| 579882 ||  || — || November 21, 2014 || Haleakala || Pan-STARRS || L5 || align=right | 8.0 km || 
|-id=883 bgcolor=#fefefe
| 579883 ||  || — || November 21, 2014 || Haleakala || Pan-STARRS ||  || align=right data-sort-value="0.82" | 820 m || 
|-id=884 bgcolor=#E9E9E9
| 579884 ||  || — || December 1, 2014 || Kitt Peak || Spacewatch ||  || align=right | 1.1 km || 
|-id=885 bgcolor=#C2FFFF
| 579885 ||  || — || March 29, 2008 || Mount Lemmon || Mount Lemmon Survey || L5 || align=right | 11 km || 
|-id=886 bgcolor=#C2FFFF
| 579886 ||  || — || December 2, 2014 || Haleakala || Pan-STARRS || L5 || align=right | 8.6 km || 
|-id=887 bgcolor=#C2FFFF
| 579887 ||  || — || October 16, 2014 || Mount Lemmon || Mount Lemmon Survey || L5 || align=right | 9.0 km || 
|-id=888 bgcolor=#E9E9E9
| 579888 ||  || — || December 18, 2001 || Kitt Peak || Spacewatch ||  || align=right | 1.8 km || 
|-id=889 bgcolor=#fefefe
| 579889 ||  || — || May 16, 2013 || Mount Lemmon || Mount Lemmon Survey ||  || align=right data-sort-value="0.75" | 750 m || 
|-id=890 bgcolor=#E9E9E9
| 579890 Mocnik ||  ||  || August 1, 2014 || La Palma || EURONEAR ||  || align=right | 1.1 km || 
|-id=891 bgcolor=#fefefe
| 579891 ||  || — || November 23, 2014 || Mount Lemmon || Mount Lemmon Survey ||  || align=right data-sort-value="0.62" | 620 m || 
|-id=892 bgcolor=#E9E9E9
| 579892 ||  || — || April 1, 2008 || Kitt Peak || Spacewatch ||  || align=right data-sort-value="0.80" | 800 m || 
|-id=893 bgcolor=#fefefe
| 579893 ||  || — || October 5, 2003 || Kitt Peak || Spacewatch ||  || align=right data-sort-value="0.84" | 840 m || 
|-id=894 bgcolor=#E9E9E9
| 579894 ||  || — || November 26, 2014 || Haleakala || Pan-STARRS ||  || align=right | 1.6 km || 
|-id=895 bgcolor=#fefefe
| 579895 ||  || — || October 11, 2010 || Mount Lemmon || Mount Lemmon Survey ||  || align=right data-sort-value="0.80" | 800 m || 
|-id=896 bgcolor=#d6d6d6
| 579896 ||  || — || November 20, 2014 || Haleakala || Pan-STARRS ||  || align=right | 4.0 km || 
|-id=897 bgcolor=#d6d6d6
| 579897 ||  || — || August 27, 2002 || Palomar || NEAT ||  || align=right | 2.2 km || 
|-id=898 bgcolor=#fefefe
| 579898 ||  || — || January 7, 2010 || Mount Lemmon || Mount Lemmon Survey || H || align=right data-sort-value="0.62" | 620 m || 
|-id=899 bgcolor=#E9E9E9
| 579899 ||  || — || November 16, 2014 || Mount Lemmon || Mount Lemmon Survey ||  || align=right | 2.1 km || 
|-id=900 bgcolor=#C2FFFF
| 579900 ||  || — || October 24, 2013 || Mount Lemmon || Mount Lemmon Survey || L5 || align=right | 8.0 km || 
|}

579901–580000 

|-bgcolor=#fefefe
| 579901 ||  || — || November 1, 1999 || Socorro || LINEAR ||  || align=right | 1.1 km || 
|-id=902 bgcolor=#C2FFFF
| 579902 ||  || — || October 3, 2013 || Kitt Peak || Spacewatch || L5 || align=right | 7.2 km || 
|-id=903 bgcolor=#E9E9E9
| 579903 ||  || — || December 1, 2014 || Haleakala || Pan-STARRS ||  || align=right | 1.8 km || 
|-id=904 bgcolor=#fefefe
| 579904 ||  || — || December 10, 2010 || Kitt Peak || Spacewatch ||  || align=right data-sort-value="0.81" | 810 m || 
|-id=905 bgcolor=#E9E9E9
| 579905 ||  || — || December 13, 2014 || Haleakala || Pan-STARRS ||  || align=right data-sort-value="0.97" | 970 m || 
|-id=906 bgcolor=#E9E9E9
| 579906 ||  || — || December 1, 2014 || Haleakala || Pan-STARRS ||  || align=right | 1.0 km || 
|-id=907 bgcolor=#fefefe
| 579907 ||  || — || May 3, 2005 || Kitt Peak || Spacewatch ||  || align=right data-sort-value="0.86" | 860 m || 
|-id=908 bgcolor=#E9E9E9
| 579908 ||  || — || January 24, 2002 || Kitt Peak || Spacewatch ||  || align=right | 1.1 km || 
|-id=909 bgcolor=#E9E9E9
| 579909 ||  || — || November 20, 2014 || Mount Lemmon || Mount Lemmon Survey ||  || align=right | 1.4 km || 
|-id=910 bgcolor=#E9E9E9
| 579910 ||  || — || May 1, 2012 || Mount Lemmon || Mount Lemmon Survey ||  || align=right data-sort-value="0.87" | 870 m || 
|-id=911 bgcolor=#fefefe
| 579911 ||  || — || December 16, 1995 || Kitt Peak || Spacewatch ||  || align=right data-sort-value="0.76" | 760 m || 
|-id=912 bgcolor=#E9E9E9
| 579912 ||  || — || January 13, 2003 || Kitt Peak || Spacewatch ||  || align=right | 1.3 km || 
|-id=913 bgcolor=#E9E9E9
| 579913 ||  || — || December 27, 2005 || Mount Lemmon || Mount Lemmon Survey ||  || align=right | 1.8 km || 
|-id=914 bgcolor=#E9E9E9
| 579914 ||  || — || November 29, 2014 || Haleakala || Pan-STARRS ||  || align=right | 1.4 km || 
|-id=915 bgcolor=#fefefe
| 579915 ||  || — || January 27, 2007 || Kitt Peak || Spacewatch || H || align=right data-sort-value="0.62" | 620 m || 
|-id=916 bgcolor=#E9E9E9
| 579916 ||  || — || January 28, 2007 || Mount Lemmon || Mount Lemmon Survey ||  || align=right data-sort-value="0.75" | 750 m || 
|-id=917 bgcolor=#E9E9E9
| 579917 ||  || — || January 24, 2011 || Mount Lemmon || Mount Lemmon Survey ||  || align=right | 1.2 km || 
|-id=918 bgcolor=#E9E9E9
| 579918 ||  || — || November 26, 2014 || Haleakala || Pan-STARRS ||  || align=right | 2.0 km || 
|-id=919 bgcolor=#E9E9E9
| 579919 ||  || — || November 11, 2001 || Apache Point || SDSS Collaboration ||  || align=right | 1.6 km || 
|-id=920 bgcolor=#E9E9E9
| 579920 ||  || — || March 31, 2008 || Mount Lemmon || Mount Lemmon Survey ||  || align=right data-sort-value="0.92" | 920 m || 
|-id=921 bgcolor=#fefefe
| 579921 ||  || — || September 28, 2006 || Mount Lemmon || Mount Lemmon Survey ||  || align=right data-sort-value="0.88" | 880 m || 
|-id=922 bgcolor=#E9E9E9
| 579922 ||  || — || October 4, 2005 || Mount Lemmon || Mount Lemmon Survey ||  || align=right | 1.4 km || 
|-id=923 bgcolor=#E9E9E9
| 579923 ||  || — || May 19, 2012 || Mount Lemmon || Mount Lemmon Survey ||  || align=right | 1.6 km || 
|-id=924 bgcolor=#E9E9E9
| 579924 ||  || — || December 29, 2005 || Palomar || NEAT ||  || align=right | 2.5 km || 
|-id=925 bgcolor=#E9E9E9
| 579925 ||  || — || November 26, 2014 || Haleakala || Pan-STARRS ||  || align=right | 1.1 km || 
|-id=926 bgcolor=#E9E9E9
| 579926 ||  || — || November 22, 2014 || Haleakala || Pan-STARRS ||  || align=right data-sort-value="0.94" | 940 m || 
|-id=927 bgcolor=#E9E9E9
| 579927 ||  || — || March 12, 2003 || Kitt Peak || Spacewatch ||  || align=right | 1.5 km || 
|-id=928 bgcolor=#fefefe
| 579928 ||  || — || December 26, 2014 || Haleakala || Pan-STARRS || H || align=right data-sort-value="0.67" | 670 m || 
|-id=929 bgcolor=#fefefe
| 579929 ||  || — || December 17, 2007 || Mount Lemmon || Mount Lemmon Survey ||  || align=right data-sort-value="0.54" | 540 m || 
|-id=930 bgcolor=#E9E9E9
| 579930 ||  || — || April 21, 2012 || Mount Lemmon || Mount Lemmon Survey ||  || align=right data-sort-value="0.91" | 910 m || 
|-id=931 bgcolor=#E9E9E9
| 579931 ||  || — || December 30, 2014 || Mount Lemmon || Mount Lemmon Survey ||  || align=right | 1.0 km || 
|-id=932 bgcolor=#fefefe
| 579932 ||  || — || September 19, 2003 || Kitt Peak || Spacewatch ||  || align=right data-sort-value="0.81" | 810 m || 
|-id=933 bgcolor=#E9E9E9
| 579933 ||  || — || October 30, 2005 || Catalina || CSS ||  || align=right | 1.5 km || 
|-id=934 bgcolor=#E9E9E9
| 579934 ||  || — || December 13, 2006 || Mount Lemmon || Mount Lemmon Survey ||  || align=right data-sort-value="0.87" | 870 m || 
|-id=935 bgcolor=#E9E9E9
| 579935 ||  || — || December 10, 2010 || Mount Lemmon || Mount Lemmon Survey ||  || align=right | 1.1 km || 
|-id=936 bgcolor=#E9E9E9
| 579936 ||  || — || August 9, 2001 || Palomar || NEAT ||  || align=right | 1.2 km || 
|-id=937 bgcolor=#E9E9E9
| 579937 ||  || — || February 17, 2002 || Palomar || NEAT ||  || align=right | 1.5 km || 
|-id=938 bgcolor=#E9E9E9
| 579938 ||  || — || March 11, 2007 || Kitt Peak || Spacewatch ||  || align=right | 1.3 km || 
|-id=939 bgcolor=#FA8072
| 579939 ||  || — || December 29, 2014 || Haleakala || Pan-STARRS || H || align=right data-sort-value="0.62" | 620 m || 
|-id=940 bgcolor=#fefefe
| 579940 ||  || — || November 30, 2014 || Haleakala || Pan-STARRS || H || align=right data-sort-value="0.66" | 660 m || 
|-id=941 bgcolor=#fefefe
| 579941 ||  || — || June 30, 2008 || Kitt Peak || Spacewatch || H || align=right data-sort-value="0.56" | 560 m || 
|-id=942 bgcolor=#E9E9E9
| 579942 ||  || — || January 30, 2011 || Piszkesteto || Z. Kuli, K. Sárneczky ||  || align=right data-sort-value="0.76" | 760 m || 
|-id=943 bgcolor=#E9E9E9
| 579943 ||  || — || November 4, 2005 || Mount Lemmon || Mount Lemmon Survey ||  || align=right | 1.2 km || 
|-id=944 bgcolor=#fefefe
| 579944 ||  || — || July 15, 2005 || Mount Lemmon || Mount Lemmon Survey ||  || align=right data-sort-value="0.98" | 980 m || 
|-id=945 bgcolor=#E9E9E9
| 579945 ||  || — || March 10, 2007 || Mount Lemmon || Mount Lemmon Survey ||  || align=right | 1.2 km || 
|-id=946 bgcolor=#fefefe
| 579946 ||  || — || December 21, 2014 || Mount Lemmon || Mount Lemmon Survey ||  || align=right data-sort-value="0.82" | 820 m || 
|-id=947 bgcolor=#E9E9E9
| 579947 ||  || — || November 26, 2013 || Mount Lemmon || Mount Lemmon Survey ||  || align=right | 1.9 km || 
|-id=948 bgcolor=#E9E9E9
| 579948 ||  || — || October 10, 2004 || Kitt Peak || L. H. Wasserman, J. R. Lovering ||  || align=right | 1.9 km || 
|-id=949 bgcolor=#E9E9E9
| 579949 ||  || — || July 16, 2004 || Cerro Tololo || Cerro Tololo Obs. ||  || align=right data-sort-value="0.97" | 970 m || 
|-id=950 bgcolor=#d6d6d6
| 579950 ||  || — || October 9, 2013 || Mount Lemmon || Mount Lemmon Survey ||  || align=right | 2.2 km || 
|-id=951 bgcolor=#E9E9E9
| 579951 ||  || — || December 18, 2014 || Haleakala || Pan-STARRS ||  || align=right | 1.5 km || 
|-id=952 bgcolor=#fefefe
| 579952 ||  || — || December 18, 2014 || Haleakala || Pan-STARRS ||  || align=right data-sort-value="0.59" | 590 m || 
|-id=953 bgcolor=#E9E9E9
| 579953 ||  || — || December 20, 2014 || Haleakala || Pan-STARRS ||  || align=right | 1.4 km || 
|-id=954 bgcolor=#E9E9E9
| 579954 ||  || — || December 24, 2014 || Mount Lemmon || Mount Lemmon Survey ||  || align=right | 1.5 km || 
|-id=955 bgcolor=#E9E9E9
| 579955 ||  || — || December 26, 2014 || Haleakala || Pan-STARRS ||  || align=right | 1.9 km || 
|-id=956 bgcolor=#E9E9E9
| 579956 ||  || — || December 21, 2014 || Mount Lemmon || Mount Lemmon Survey ||  || align=right | 2.9 km || 
|-id=957 bgcolor=#E9E9E9
| 579957 ||  || — || February 9, 2011 || Mount Lemmon || Mount Lemmon Survey ||  || align=right | 1.3 km || 
|-id=958 bgcolor=#E9E9E9
| 579958 ||  || — || December 28, 2014 || Mount Lemmon || Mount Lemmon Survey ||  || align=right | 1.0 km || 
|-id=959 bgcolor=#d6d6d6
| 579959 ||  || — || December 29, 2014 || Haleakala || Pan-STARRS ||  || align=right | 2.3 km || 
|-id=960 bgcolor=#d6d6d6
| 579960 ||  || — || October 2, 2014 || Haleakala || Pan-STARRS || 3:2 || align=right | 3.8 km || 
|-id=961 bgcolor=#fefefe
| 579961 ||  || — || September 20, 2011 || Haleakala || Pan-STARRS || H || align=right data-sort-value="0.51" | 510 m || 
|-id=962 bgcolor=#E9E9E9
| 579962 ||  || — || August 17, 2009 || Siding Spring || SSS ||  || align=right | 1.8 km || 
|-id=963 bgcolor=#E9E9E9
| 579963 ||  || — || October 4, 2014 || Haleakala || Pan-STARRS ||  || align=right | 1.3 km || 
|-id=964 bgcolor=#E9E9E9
| 579964 ||  || — || September 18, 2009 || Mount Lemmon || Mount Lemmon Survey ||  || align=right data-sort-value="0.71" | 710 m || 
|-id=965 bgcolor=#E9E9E9
| 579965 ||  || — || December 1, 2014 || Haleakala || Pan-STARRS ||  || align=right | 1.2 km || 
|-id=966 bgcolor=#E9E9E9
| 579966 ||  || — || October 16, 2001 || Palomar || NEAT ||  || align=right | 1.1 km || 
|-id=967 bgcolor=#fefefe
| 579967 ||  || — || November 16, 2006 || Catalina || CSS ||  || align=right | 1.0 km || 
|-id=968 bgcolor=#fefefe
| 579968 ||  || — || October 30, 2010 || Mount Lemmon || Mount Lemmon Survey ||  || align=right data-sort-value="0.87" | 870 m || 
|-id=969 bgcolor=#fefefe
| 579969 ||  || — || September 23, 2004 || Kitt Peak || Spacewatch ||  || align=right data-sort-value="0.54" | 540 m || 
|-id=970 bgcolor=#E9E9E9
| 579970 ||  || — || December 11, 2009 || Mount Lemmon || Mount Lemmon Survey ||  || align=right | 1.8 km || 
|-id=971 bgcolor=#E9E9E9
| 579971 ||  || — || November 25, 2009 || Kitt Peak || Spacewatch ||  || align=right | 1.5 km || 
|-id=972 bgcolor=#E9E9E9
| 579972 ||  || — || December 2, 2005 || Kitt Peak || L. H. Wasserman, R. Millis ||  || align=right | 1.6 km || 
|-id=973 bgcolor=#E9E9E9
| 579973 ||  || — || December 21, 2014 || Mount Lemmon || Mount Lemmon Survey ||  || align=right | 1.5 km || 
|-id=974 bgcolor=#C2FFFF
| 579974 ||  || — || March 29, 2008 || Kitt Peak || Spacewatch || L5 || align=right | 7.3 km || 
|-id=975 bgcolor=#E9E9E9
| 579975 ||  || — || October 26, 2014 || Mount Lemmon || Mount Lemmon Survey ||  || align=right | 1.6 km || 
|-id=976 bgcolor=#fefefe
| 579976 ||  || — || April 3, 2013 || Palomar || PTF || H || align=right data-sort-value="0.51" | 510 m || 
|-id=977 bgcolor=#fefefe
| 579977 ||  || — || November 3, 2014 || Mount Lemmon || Mount Lemmon Survey || H || align=right data-sort-value="0.62" | 620 m || 
|-id=978 bgcolor=#fefefe
| 579978 ||  || — || March 5, 2008 || Mount Lemmon || Mount Lemmon Survey ||  || align=right data-sort-value="0.84" | 840 m || 
|-id=979 bgcolor=#fefefe
| 579979 ||  || — || November 26, 2014 || Haleakala || Pan-STARRS ||  || align=right | 1.0 km || 
|-id=980 bgcolor=#E9E9E9
| 579980 ||  || — || April 9, 2003 || Kitt Peak || Spacewatch ||  || align=right | 1.6 km || 
|-id=981 bgcolor=#E9E9E9
| 579981 ||  || — || November 9, 2009 || Mount Lemmon || Mount Lemmon Survey ||  || align=right | 1.7 km || 
|-id=982 bgcolor=#E9E9E9
| 579982 ||  || — || December 10, 2009 || Mount Lemmon || Mount Lemmon Survey ||  || align=right | 2.0 km || 
|-id=983 bgcolor=#E9E9E9
| 579983 ||  || — || July 13, 2013 || Mount Lemmon || Mount Lemmon Survey ||  || align=right data-sort-value="0.73" | 730 m || 
|-id=984 bgcolor=#E9E9E9
| 579984 ||  || — || December 29, 2014 || Mount Lemmon || Mount Lemmon Survey ||  || align=right | 1.8 km || 
|-id=985 bgcolor=#E9E9E9
| 579985 ||  || — || December 11, 2009 || Mount Lemmon || Mount Lemmon Survey ||  || align=right | 1.9 km || 
|-id=986 bgcolor=#fefefe
| 579986 ||  || — || October 22, 2006 || Mount Lemmon || Mount Lemmon Survey ||  || align=right data-sort-value="0.52" | 520 m || 
|-id=987 bgcolor=#E9E9E9
| 579987 ||  || — || January 13, 2015 || Haleakala || Pan-STARRS ||  || align=right | 1.1 km || 
|-id=988 bgcolor=#fefefe
| 579988 ||  || — || December 15, 2014 || Mount Lemmon || Mount Lemmon Survey ||  || align=right data-sort-value="0.57" | 570 m || 
|-id=989 bgcolor=#E9E9E9
| 579989 ||  || — || August 31, 2005 || Palomar || NEAT ||  || align=right | 1.0 km || 
|-id=990 bgcolor=#E9E9E9
| 579990 ||  || — || June 2, 2013 || Mount Lemmon || Mount Lemmon Survey ||  || align=right | 1.0 km || 
|-id=991 bgcolor=#E9E9E9
| 579991 ||  || — || October 8, 2005 || Kitt Peak || Spacewatch ||  || align=right | 1.2 km || 
|-id=992 bgcolor=#E9E9E9
| 579992 ||  || — || May 12, 2012 || Mount Lemmon || Mount Lemmon Survey ||  || align=right | 1.8 km || 
|-id=993 bgcolor=#E9E9E9
| 579993 ||  || — || July 24, 2000 || Kitt Peak || Spacewatch ||  || align=right | 1.8 km || 
|-id=994 bgcolor=#fefefe
| 579994 ||  || — || May 17, 2013 || Mount Lemmon || Mount Lemmon Survey || H || align=right data-sort-value="0.48" | 480 m || 
|-id=995 bgcolor=#E9E9E9
| 579995 ||  || — || August 30, 2005 || Kitt Peak || Spacewatch ||  || align=right data-sort-value="0.62" | 620 m || 
|-id=996 bgcolor=#E9E9E9
| 579996 ||  || — || December 21, 2014 || Mount Lemmon || Mount Lemmon Survey ||  || align=right | 1.3 km || 
|-id=997 bgcolor=#E9E9E9
| 579997 ||  || — || July 16, 2004 || Cerro Tololo || Cerro Tololo Obs. ||  || align=right | 1.0 km || 
|-id=998 bgcolor=#E9E9E9
| 579998 ||  || — || November 24, 2014 || Mount Lemmon || Mount Lemmon Survey ||  || align=right | 1.5 km || 
|-id=999 bgcolor=#E9E9E9
| 579999 ||  || — || January 28, 2011 || Mount Lemmon || Mount Lemmon Survey ||  || align=right data-sort-value="0.91" | 910 m || 
|-id=000 bgcolor=#E9E9E9
| 580000 ||  || — || November 7, 2005 || Mauna Kea || Mauna Kea Obs. ||  || align=right | 1.7 km || 
|}

References

External links 
 Discovery Circumstances: Numbered Minor Planets (575001)–(580000) (IAU Minor Planet Center)

0579